= Minimum audibility curve =

Minimum audibility curve is a standardized graph of the threshold of hearing frequency for an average human, and is used as the reference level when measuring hearing loss with an audiometer as shown on an audiogram.

Audiograms are produced using a piece of test equipment called an audiometer, and this allows different frequencies to be presented to the subject, usually over calibrated headphones, at any specified level. The levels are, however, not absolute, but weighted with frequency relative to a standard graph known as the minimum audibility curve which is intended to represent 'normal' hearing. This is not the best threshold found for all subjects, under ideal test conditions, which is represented by around 0 phon or the threshold of hearing on the equal-loudness contours, but is standardised in an ANSI standard to a level somewhat higher at 1 kHz . There are several definitions of the minimal audibility curve, defined in different international standards, and they differ significantly, giving rise to differences in audiograms according to the audiometer used. The ASA-1951 standard for example used a level of 16.5 dB SPL at 1 kHz whereas the later ANSI-1969/ISO-1963 standard uses 6.5 dB SPL, and it is common to allow a 10 dB correction for the older standard.

== See also ==
- Articulation index
- Audiogram
- Audiology
- Audiometry
- A-weighting
- Equal-loudness contour
- Hearing range
- Hearing (sense)
- Psychoacoustics
- Pure tone audiometry
