= Harvey Fletcher =

American physicist (1884–1981)

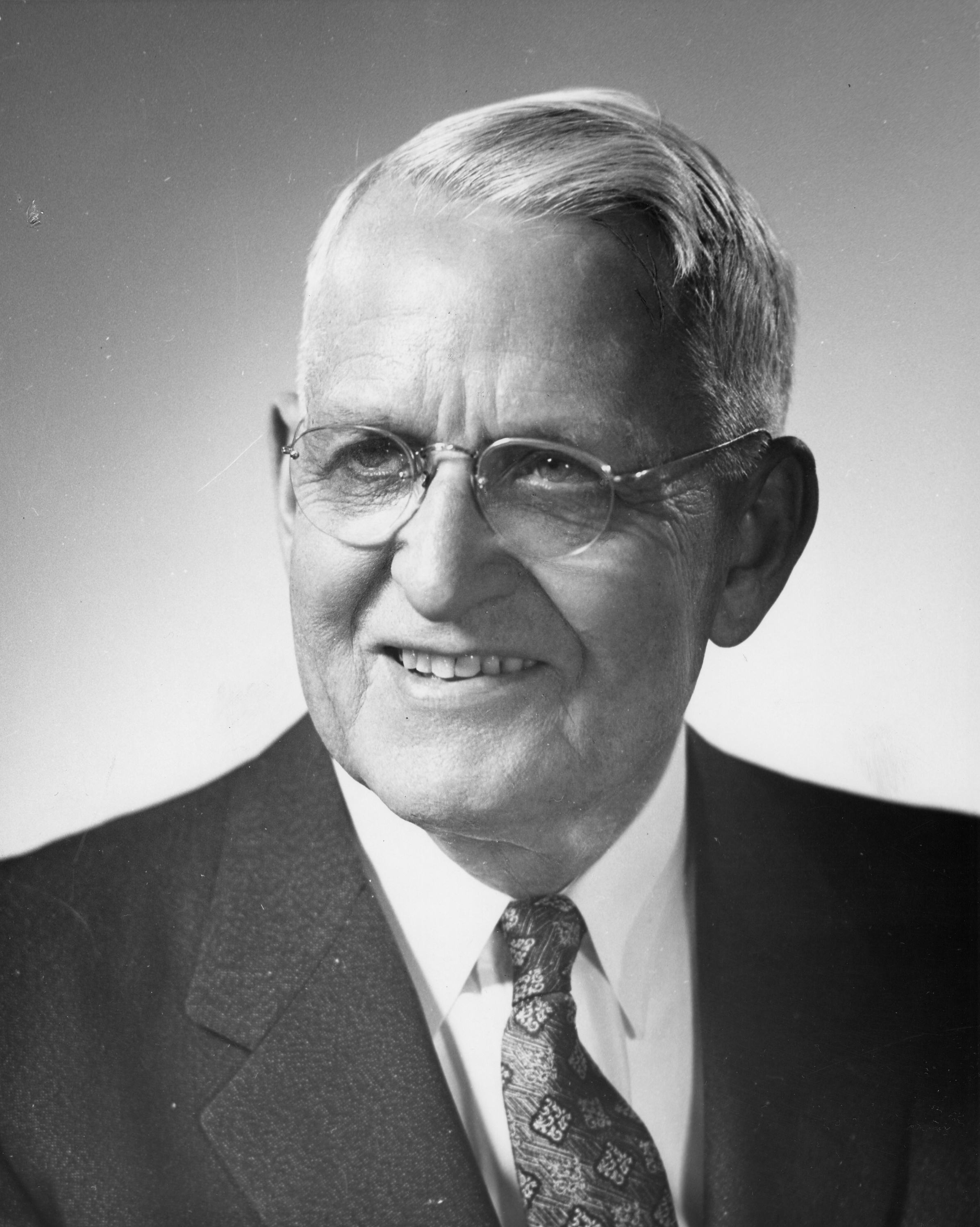
- Born: September 11, 1884; Provo, Utah, U.S.
- Died: July 23, 1981 (aged 96); Provo, Utah, U.S.
- Education: Brigham Young University; University of Chicago
- Known for: Invention of the hearing aid The father of stereophonic sound Oil drop experiment measuring the charge of the electron
- Awards: Presidential Citation; Louis E. Levy Medal (1924); ASA Gold Medal (1957); Audio Engineering Society Gold Medal Award (1958); IEEE Founders Medal (1967); Grammy Award (2016)
- Scientific career
- Fields: Physics
- Workplaces: Western Electric; Bell Laboratories; Columbia University
- Doctoral advisor: Robert A. Millikan

Harvey Fletcher (September 11, 1884 – July 23, 1981) was an American physicist. Known as the "father of stereophonic sound", he is credited with the invention of the 2-A audiometer and an early electronic hearing aid. He was an investigator into the nature of speech and hearing, and made contributions in acoustics, electrical engineering, speech, medicine, music, atomic physics, sound pictures, and education. Following his death, he was credited with collaborating with his doctoral advisor, Robert Millikan, on the Nobel-prize winning oil drop experiment which first determined the charge of the electron.

== Early years ==
Fletcher was born in Provo, Utah. He graduated from Brigham Young High School in 1904. He enrolled at Brigham Young University (BYU), graduating in 1907 with a bachelor's degree. He married Lorena Chipman. They were the parents of seven children. Harvey Fletcher was the father of James C. Fletcher, former president of the University of Utah and NASA Administrator and of Harvey J. Fletcher, a BYU math professor.

== Graduate work ==
In 1911, Fletcher was the first physics student to earn a PhD summa cum laude from the University of Chicago. His dissertation research was on methods to determine the charge of an electron. This included the oil drop experiment commonly attributed to his advisor and collaborator, Robert Andrews Millikan. Millikan took sole credit, in return for Fletcher claiming full authorship on a related result for his dissertation. Fletcher's contributions were detail-oriented but still contributed to the successful experiment, in which he incorporated, among other things, experience with projection lanterns. Millikan went on to win the 1923 Nobel Prize for Physics, in part for this work, and Fletcher kept the agreement a secret until his death.

After completing his doctorate, he returned to BYU, where he became the head of the physics department. He served in this capacity from 1911 until 1916. Fletcher left BYU to work at Western Electric, establishing himself as a researcher. He organized the founding of the Acoustical Society of America (ASA) in 1929. He joined the Bell Telephone Laboratories' Engineering Staff Research Department where he found great interest in the physics of sound (acoustical science). He worked there from 1933 to 1949, when he became a professor of electrical engineering at Columbia University from 1949 to 1952. He returned to BYU in 1952 to be the director of research. He served in that role as well as being the first dean of the new college of physics and engineering sciences until 1958.

== Notable contributions ==
Fletcher's contributions to speech perception are among his best-known work. He showed that speech features are usually spread over a wide frequency range, and developed the articulation index to approximately quantify the quality of a speech channel. He also developed the concepts of equal-loudness contours (commonly known as Fletcher–Munson curves), loudness scaling and summation, and the critical band.

At Bell Labs, he oversaw research in electrical sound recording, including the first successful stereophonic recordings, the first live stereo sound transmission, and the production of the first vinyl recording. All of this was done with the help of the conductor of the Philadelphia Orchestra, Leopold Stokowski, between 1931 and 1932. Some of his other accomplishments include the production of the first functional hearing aid, the 2-A audiometer, and the artificial larynx. At Bell Labs, he worked with and was reportedly a tremendous influence on Harold Burris-Meyer, who developed advances in psychoacoustics.

Much of his research is considered to be authoritative, and his books, Speech and Hearing and Speech and Hearing in Communication, are notable treatises on the subject.

== Honors ==
Fletcher was elected an honorary fellow of the Acoustical Society of America in 1949, the second person to receive this honor after Thomas Edison, 20 years earlier. He was president of the American Society for Hard of Hearing, an honorary member of the American Otological Society and an honorary member of the Audio Engineering Society. In 1924 he was awarded the Louis E. Levy Medal by the Franklin Institute for physical measurements of audition. He was president of the American Physical Society. He was the first president of Acoustical Society of America (1929–31). In 1937 he was elected vice-president of the American Association for the Advancement of Science. He was a member of the National Academy of Sciences. He was also a member of the National Hearing Division Committee of Medical Sciences. He was given the Progress Medal Award by the American Academy of Motion Pictures, in Hollywood. For eight years he acted as National Councilor for the Ohio State University Research Foundation.

In 2010, Fletcher was honored by BYU as the founding dean of its College of Engineering (now the Ira A. Fulton College of Engineering).

The Harvey Fletcher Engineering Laboratory Building at BYU is named after him.

On April 23, 2016, Fletcher was awarded a posthumous technical Grammy Award for his research and inventions related to stereophonic sound.

== Personal life ==
Fletcher was a devout member of the Church of Jesus Christ of Latter-day Saints.

He died on July 23, 1981, after a stroke.
