= Hearing range =

Range of frequencies that can be heard by humans or other animals

Logarithmic chart of the hearing ranges of some animals

Hearing range describes the frequency range that can be heard by humans or other animals, though it can also refer to the range of levels. The human range is commonly given as 20 to 20,000 Hz, (Note: 20 to 20,000 Hz corresponds to sound waves in air at 20 °C with wavelengths of 17 meters to 1.7 cm (56 ft to 0.7 inch).) although there is considerable variation between individuals, especially at high frequencies, and a gradual loss of sensitivity to higher frequencies with age is considered normal. Sensitivity also varies with frequency, as shown by equal-loudness contours. Routine investigation for hearing loss usually involves an audiogram which shows threshold levels relative to a normal.

Several animal species can hear frequencies well beyond the human hearing range. Some dolphins and bats, for example, can hear frequencies over 100 kHz. Elephants can hear sounds at 16 Hz–12 kHz, while some whales can hear infrasonic sounds as low as 7 Hz.

== Physiology ==
The 'hairs' in hair cells in the inner ear, stereocilia, range in height from 1 μm, for auditory detection of very high frequencies, to 50 μm or more in some vestibular systems.

== Measurement ==
A basic measure of hearing is afforded by an audiogram, a graph of the absolute threshold of hearing (minimum discernible sound level) at various frequencies throughout an organism's nominal hearing range.

Behavioural hearing tests or physiological tests can be used to find the hearing thresholds of humans and other animals. For humans, the test involves tones being presented at specific frequencies (pitch) and intensities (loudness). When the subject hears the sound, they indicate this by raising a hand or pressing a button. The lowest intensity they can hear is recorded. The test varies for children; their response to the sound can be indicated by a turn of the head or by using a toy. The child learns what to do upon hearing the sound, such as placing a toy man in a boat. A similar technique can be used when testing animals, where food is used as a reward for responding to the sound. The information on different mammals' hearing was obtained primarily by behavioural hearing tests.

Physiological tests do not need the patient to respond consciously.

== Humans ==
Human hearing area in frequency and intensity. Dashed line describes possible changes due to excessive hearing strain (e.g. loud music).

In humans, sound waves funnel into the ear via the external ear canal and reach the eardrum (tympanic membrane). The compression and rarefaction of these waves set this thin membrane in motion, causing sympathetic vibration through the middle ear bones (the ossicles: malleus, incus, and stapes), the basilar fluid in the cochlea, and the hairs within it, called stereocilia. These hairs line the cochlea from base to apex, and the part stimulated and the intensity of stimulation give an indication of the nature of the sound. Information gathered from the hair cells is sent via the auditory nerve for processing in the brain.

The commonly stated range of human hearing is 20 to 20,000 Hz. Under ideal laboratory conditions, humans can hear sound as low as 12 Hz and as high as 28 kHz, though the threshold increases sharply at 15 kHz in adults, corresponding to the last auditory channel of the cochlea. The human auditory system is most sensitive to frequencies between 2,000 and 5,000 Hz. Individual hearing range varies according to the general condition of a human's ears and nervous system. The range shrinks during life, usually beginning at around the age of eight with the upper frequency limit being reduced. Women lose their hearing somewhat less often than men. This is due to a lot of social and external factors. For example, men spend more time in noisy places, and this is associated not only with work but also with hobbies and other activities. Women have a sharper hearing loss after menopause. In women, hearing decrease is worse at low and partially medium frequencies, while men are more likely to suffer from hearing loss at high frequencies.

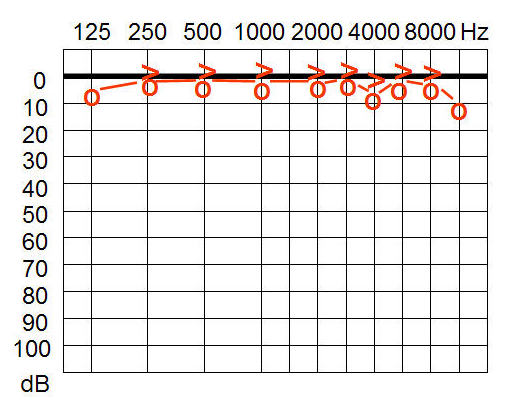
An audiogram showing typical hearing variation from a standardized norm.

Audiograms of human hearing are produced using an audiometer, which presents different frequencies to the subject, usually over calibrated headphones, at specified levels. The levels are weighted with frequency relative to a standard graph known as the minimum audibility curve, which is intended to represent "normal" hearing. The threshold of hearing is set at around 0 phon on the equal-loudness contours (i.e. 20 micropascals, approximately the quietest sound a young healthy human can detect), but is standardised in an ANSI standard to 1 kHz. Standards using different reference levels, give rise to differences in audiograms. The ASA-1951 standard, for example, used a level of 16.5 dB SPL (sound pressure level) at 1 kHz, whereas the later ANSI-1969/ISO-1963 standard uses 6.5 dB SPL, with a 10 dB correction applied for older people.

== Other primates ==
Several primates, especially small ones, can hear frequencies far into the ultrasonic range. Measured with a 60 dB SPL signal, the hearing range for the Senegal bushbaby is 92 Hz–65 kHz, and 67 Hz–58 kHz for the ring-tailed lemur. Of 19 primates tested, the Japanese macaque had the widest range, 28 Hz–34.5 kHz, compared with 31 Hz–17.6 kHz for humans.

== Cats ==
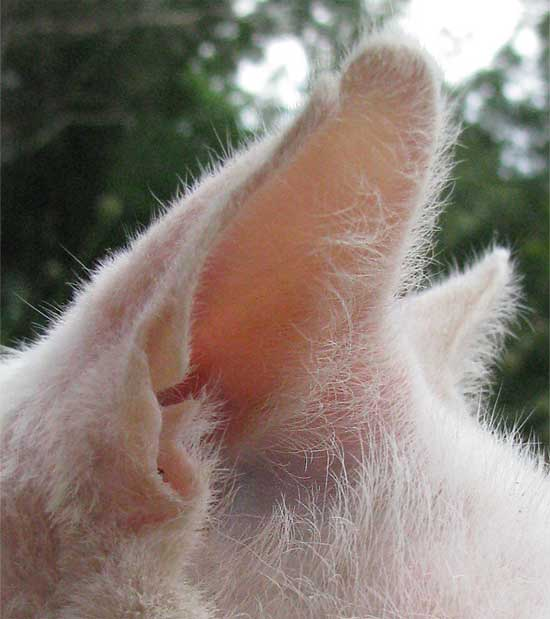
Outer ear (pinnae) of a cat

Cats have excellent hearing and can detect an extremely broad range of frequencies. They can hear higher-pitched sounds than humans or most dogs, detecting frequencies from 55 Hz up to 79 kHz. Cats do not use this ability to hear ultrasound for communication but it is probably important in hunting, since many species of rodents make ultrasonic calls. Cat hearing is also extremely sensitive and is among the best of any mammal, being most acute in the range of 500 Hz to 32 kHz. This sensitivity is further enhanced by the cat's large movable outer ears (their pinnae), which both amplify sounds and help a cat sense the direction from which a noise is coming.

== Dogs ==
The hearing ability of a dog is dependent on breed and age, though the range of hearing is usually around 67 Hz to 45 kHz. As with humans, some dog breeds' hearing ranges narrow with age, such as the German Shepherd and miniature poodle. When dogs hear a sound, they will move their ears towards it in order to maximize reception. In order to achieve this, the ears of a dog are controlled by at least 18 muscles, which allow the ears to tilt and rotate. The ear's shape also allows the sound to be heard more accurately. Many breeds often have upright and curved ears, which direct and amplify sounds.

As dogs hear higher frequency sounds than humans, they have a different acoustic perception of the world. Sounds that seem loud to humans often emit high-frequency tones that can scare away dogs. Whistles which emit ultrasonic sound, called dog whistles, are used in dog training, as a dog will respond much better to such levels. In the wild, dogs use their hearing capabilities to hunt and locate food. Domestic breeds are often used to guard property due to their increased hearing ability. So-called "Nelson" dog whistles generate sounds at frequencies higher than those audible to humans but well within the range of a dog's hearing.

== Bats ==
Bats have evolved very sensitive hearing to cope with their nocturnal activity. Their hearing range varies by species; at the lowest it can be 1 kHz for some species and for other species the highest reaches up to 200 kHz. Bats that can detect 200 kHz cannot hear very well below 10 kHz. In any case, the most sensitive range of bat hearing is narrower: about 15 kHz to 90 kHz.

Bats navigate around objects and locate their prey using echolocation. A bat will produce a very loud, short sound and assess the echo when it bounces back. Bats hunt flying insects; these insects return a faint echo of the bat's call. The type of insect, how big it is and distance can be determined by the quality of the echo and time it takes for the echo to rebound. There are two types of call constant frequency (CF), and frequency modulated (FM) that descend in pitch. Each type reveals different information; CF is used to detect an object, and FM is used to assess its distance. The pulses of sound produced by the bat last only a few thousandths of a second; silences between the calls give time to listen for the information coming back in the form of an echo. Evidence suggests that bats use the change in pitch of sound produced via the Doppler effect to assess their flight speed in relation to objects around them. The information regarding size, shape and texture is built up to form a picture of their surroundings and the location of their prey. Using these factors a bat can successfully track change in movements and therefore hunt down their prey.

== Mice ==
Mice have large ears in comparison to their bodies. They hear higher frequencies than humans; their frequency range is 1 kHz to 70 kHz. They do not hear the lower frequencies that humans can; they communicate using high-frequency noises some of which are inaudible by humans. The distress call of a young mouse can be produced at 40 kHz. The mice use their ability to produce sounds out of predators' frequency ranges to alert other mice of danger without exposing themselves, though notably, cats' hearing range encompasses the mouse's entire vocal range. The squeaks that humans can hear are lower in frequency and are used by the mouse to make longer distance calls, as low-frequency sounds can travel farther than high-frequency sounds.

== Birds ==
Hearing is birds' second most important sense and their ears are funnel-shaped to focus sound. The ears are located slightly behind and below the eyes, and they are covered with soft feathers – the auriculars – for protection. The shape of a bird's head can also affect its hearing, such as owls, whose facial discs help direct sound toward their ears.

The hearing range of birds is most sensitive between 1 kHz and 4 kHz, but their full range is roughly similar to human hearing, with higher or lower limits depending on the bird species. No kind of bird has been observed to react to ultrasonic sounds, but certain kinds of birds can hear infrasonic sounds. "Birds are especially sensitive to pitch, tone and rhythm changes and use those variations to recognize other individual birds, even in a noisy flock. Birds also use different sounds, songs and calls in different situations, and recognizing the different noises is essential to determine if a call is warning of a predator, advertising a territorial claim or offering to share food."

"Some birds, most notably oilbirds, also use echolocation, just as bats do. These birds live in caves and use their rapid chirps and clicks to navigate through dark caves where even sensitive vision may not be useful enough."

Pigeons can hear infrasound. With the average pigeon being able to hear sounds as low as 0.5 Hz, they can detect distant storms, earthquakes and even volcanoes. This also helps them to navigate.

== Insects ==
Greater wax moths (Galleria mellonella) have the highest recorded sound frequency range that has been recorded so far. They can hear frequencies up to 300 kHz. This is likely to help them evade bats.

== Fish ==
Fish have a narrow hearing range compared to most mammals. Goldfish and catfish do possess a Weberian apparatus and have a wider hearing range than the tuna.

== Marine mammals ==
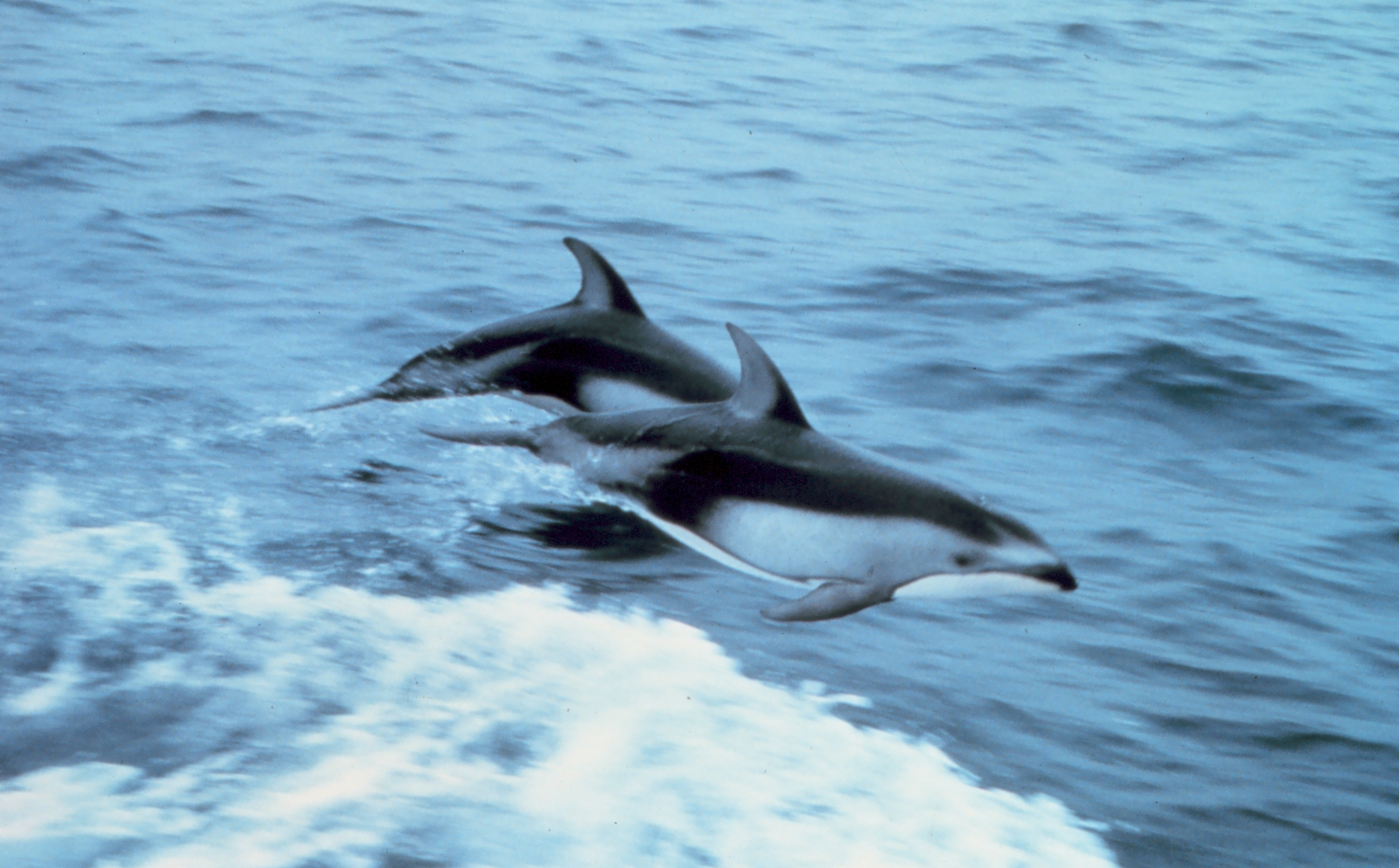
Dolphins

As aquatic environments have very different physical properties than land environments, there are differences in how marine mammals hear compared with land mammals. The differences in auditory systems have led to extensive research on aquatic mammals, specifically on dolphins.

Researchers customarily divide marine mammals into five hearing groups based on their range of best underwater hearing. (Ketten, 1998): Low-frequency baleen whales like blue whales (7 Hz to 35 kHz); Mid-frequency toothed whales like most dolphins and sperm whales (150 Hz to 160 kHz); High-frequency toothed whales like some dolphins and porpoises (275 Hz to 160 kHz); seals (50 Hz to 86 kHz); fur seals and sea lions (60 Hz to 39 kHz).

The auditory system of a land mammal typically works via the transfer of sound waves through the ear canals. Ear canals in seals, sea lions, and walruses are similar to those of land mammals and may function the same way. In whales and dolphins, it is not entirely clear how sound is propagated to the ear, but some studies strongly suggest that sound is channelled to the ear by tissues in the area of the lower jaw. One group of whales, the Odontocetes (toothed whales), use echolocation to determine the position of objects such as prey. The toothed whales are also unusual in that the ears are separated from the skull and placed well apart, which assists them with localizing sounds, an important element for echolocation.

Studies have found there to be two different types of cochlea in the dolphin population. Type I has been found in the Amazon river dolphin and harbour porpoises. These types of dolphin use extremely high frequency signals for echolocation. Harbour porpoises emit sounds at two bands, one at 2 kHz and one above 110 kHz. The cochlea in these dolphins is specialised to accommodate extreme high frequency sounds and is extremely narrow at the base.

Type II cochlea are found primarily in offshore and open water species of whales, such as the bottlenose dolphin. The sounds produced by bottlenose dolphins are lower in frequency and range typically between 75 and 150,000 Hz. The higher frequencies in this range are also used for echolocation and the lower frequencies are commonly associated with social interaction as the signals travel much farther distances.

Marine mammals use vocalisations in many different ways. Dolphins communicate via clicks and whistles, and whales use low-frequency moans or pulse signals. Each signal varies in terms of frequency and different signals are used to communicate different aspects. In dolphins, echolocation is used in order to detect and characterize objects and whistles are used in sociable herds as identification and communication devices.

== See also ==
- Audiology
- Audiometry
- Auditory system
- Diplacusis
- The Mosquito
- Safe listening
- Seismic communication
- Minimum audibility curve
- Musical acoustics
