= Audiogram =

Graph showing audible frequencies

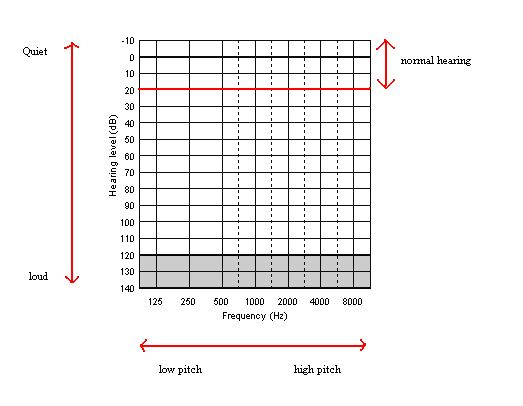
Audiogram

An audiogram is a graph that shows the audible threshold for standardized frequencies as measured by an audiometer. The Y axis represents intensity measured in decibels (dB) and the X axis represents frequency measured in hertz (Hz). The threshold of hearing is plotted relative to a standardised curve that represents 'typical' hearing, in dB(HL) (hearing level). They are not the same as equal-loudness contours, which are a set of curves representing equal loudness at different levels, as well as at the threshold of hearing, in absolute terms measured in dB(SPL) (sound pressure level).

The frequencies displayed on the audiogram are octaves, which represent a doubling in frequency (e.g., 250 Hz, 500 Hz, 1000 Hz, wtc). Commonly tested "inter-octave" frequencies (e.g., 3000 Hz) may also be displayed. The intensities displayed on the audiogram appear as linear 10 dBHL steps. However, decibels are a logarithmic scale, so that successive 10 dB increments represent greater increases in loudness.

Hearing thresholds of humans and other mammals can be found with behavioural hearing tests or physiological tests used in audiometry. For adults, a behavioural hearing test involves a tester who presents tones at specific frequencies (pitches) and intensities (loudnesses). When the testee hears the sound he or she responds (e.g., by raising a hand or pressing a button). The tester records the lowest intensity sound the testee can hear.

== Testing Hearing ==
With children, an audiologist makes a game out of the hearing test by replacing the feedback device with activity-related toys such as blocks or pegs. This is referred to as conditioned play audiometry. Visual reinforcement audiometry is also used with children. When the child hears the sound, he or she looks in the direction the sound came from and are reinforced with a light and/or animated toy. A similar technique can be used when testing some animals but instead of a toy, food can be used as a reward for responding to the sound.

Physiological tests do not need the patient to respond (Katz 2002). For example, when performing the brainstem auditory evoked potentials the patient's brainstem responses are being measured when a sound is played into their ear, or otoacoustic emissions which are generated by a healthy inner ear either spontaneously or evoked by an outside stimulus. In the US, the NIOSH recommends that people who are regularly exposed to hazardous noise have their hearing tested once a year, or every three years otherwise.

== Measurement ==
Audiograms are produced using a piece of test equipment called an audiometer, and this allows different frequencies to be presented to the subject, usually over calibrated headphones, at any specified level. The levels are, however, not absolute, but weighted with frequency relative to a standard graph known as the minimum audibility curve which is intended to represent a 'typical' hearing. This is not the best threshold found for all subjects, under ideal test conditions, which is represented by around 0 Phon or the threshold of hearing on the equal-loudness contours, but is standardised in an ANSI standard to a level somewhat higher at 1 kHz. There are several definitions of the minimal audibility curve, defined in different international standards, and they differ significantly, giving rise to differences in audiograms according to the audiometer used. The ASA-1951 standard for example used a level of 16.5 dB(SPL) at 1 kHz whereas the later ANSI-1969/ISO-1963 standard uses 6.5 dB(SPL), and it is common to allow a 10 dB correction for the older standard.

"Conventional" pure tone audiometry (testing frequencies up to 8 kHz) is the basic measure of hearing status. For research purposes, or early diagnosis of age-related hearing loss, ultra-high frequency audiograms (up to 20 kHz), requiring special audiometer calibration and headphones, can be measured.

== Reading Audiograms ==
=== Symbols ===
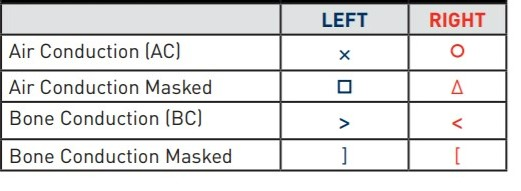
Air Conduction and Bone Conduction symbols as shown on an audiogram (masked and unmasked).

Different symbols indicate which ear the response is from and what type of response it is. Results of air conduction audiometry (in which the signals are presented to the ear through headphones, which create vibrations in the air) are reported using circles for the right ear and Xs for the left ear. Air conduction audiometry tests the functioning of the outer and middle ears, including the eardrum. Results of bone conduction audiometry (in which signals are presented using a vibrator which creates vibrations in the temporal bones of the head in order to bypass the outer and middle ear and test the inner ear and auditory nerve alone) are reporting using brackets. The open edge of the bracket indicates the ear tested, with < or [ representing a right bone conduction threshold and > or ] representing a left bone conduction threshold. When colors are used on an audiogram, red indicates the right ear and blue indicates the left ear. Masking can also be conducted during air and bone conduction testing to prevent the non-test ear from hearing the sound presented to the tested ear. For masked air conduction the symbols are a blue square for the left ear, and a red triangle for the right ear. For masked bone conduction, the symbols are a blue ] for the left ear, and a red [ for the right ear.

== Type, Degree, and Configuration ==
Audiograms illustrate the type, degree, configuration, and symmetry of an individual’s hearing.

=== Type ===
The type of elevated hearing that someone has could be sensorineural, conductive, or mixed. Sensorineural hearing loss occurs due to damaged hair cells in the cochlear or inner ear, or damage to the vestibulocochlear nerve. The most common causes of this type of loss are acoustic trauma (i.e. an explosion), ototoxic medications, or fetal complications at birth. On an audiogram, sensorineural hearing loss is shown when there is no air-bone gap or no separation between the air conduction and the bone conduction thresholds, yet they are both in the atypical threshold range. Conductive hearing refers to damage in the middle ear and has many potential causes including ear infections, ear wax build up, and ear tumors. This type of elevated hearing is illustrated on the audiogram when there is an air-bone gap of at least 15 dB and the bone conduction thresholds are typical and the air conduction thresholds are atypical. For mixed hearing loss, there is generally an issue involving both the outer/middle and inner ear. For instance, a buildup of ear wax would lead to middle ear issues and exposure to loud noises like gun shots would lead to inner ear issues, and if they occur simultaneously then the patient is experiencing mixed hearing loss or elevated hearing. Mixed hearing loss is shown on the audiogram as atypical bone and air conduction thresholds with an air-bone gap of at least 15 dB.

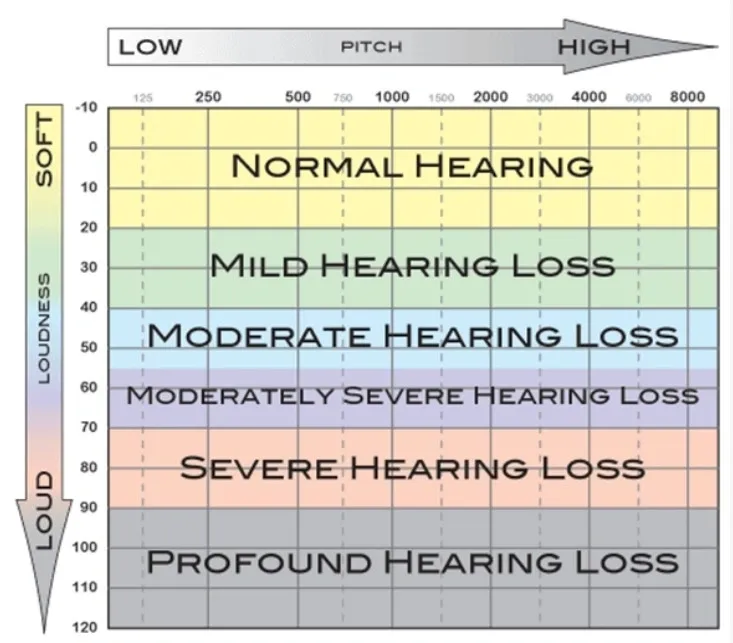
The degrees of hearing loss shown on an audiogram.

==== Degree ====
The degree of hearing loss is separated into seven different levels. There are slight differences in the measurements when discussing elevated hearing in children versus adults, but the ranges are relatively similar. The first being typical hearing, previously referred to as ‘normal,’ which ranges from -10-15 dB HL in children and -10-20 dB HL in adults. Slight hearing loss ranges from about 16-25 dB, mild is in the 26-40 dB HL range, moderate is 41-55 dB HL, moderately severe is 56-70 dB HL, severe hearing levels are 71-90 dB HL, and lastly profound hearing levels are 91 dB HL and louder. The degree of one’s hearing loss can help an audiologist determine which assistive hearing technology will be the most effective for them, if the patient wishes to use them.

===== Configuration =====
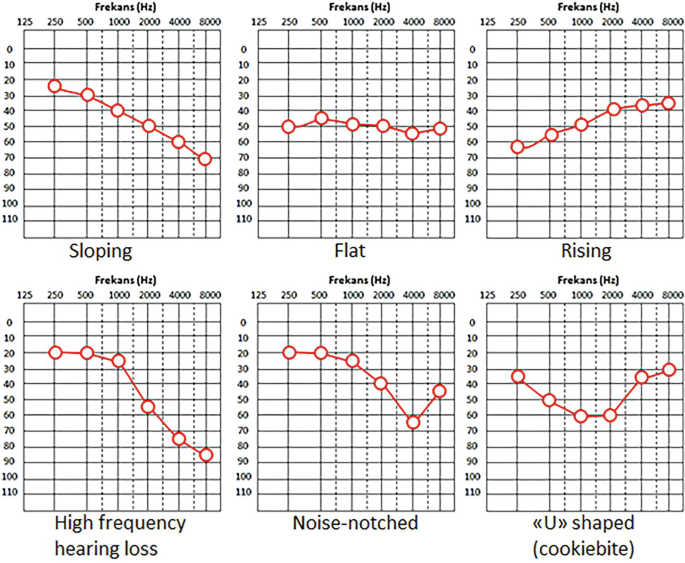
The different possible configurations that can be shown on an audiogram at different frequencies.

The air and bone conduction thresholds on the audiogram can create figures or patterns across the different frequencies that inform the audiologist of what is going on in their auditory system, and at which frequencies the issue occurs. The configurations consist of: flat, sloping, steeply sloping, rising, U-shaped, notched, or cookie bite. These configurations have titles that directly correspond to how they appear visually on an audiogram.

== Additional Information ==
=== Symmetry ===
Hearing can also be unilateral, meaning that one ear has elevated hearing thresholds whereas the hearing in the other ear is typical. It is also possible to have asymmetrical hearing levels, where both ears have hearing loss but one ear has a more severe loss than the other. To distinguish between the hearing levels of each ear, making can be a helpful tool in differentiating the two ears. Patients with the same level of hearing loss in both ears have symmetrical hearing loss, and also bilateral hearing loss; meaning that both ears have the same elevated hearing thresholds. The symmetry of a patient's hearing loss can help to determine which assistive hearing device they may want to use, and if they should buy one or two.

==== Aided Testing ====
If a patient uses assistive hearing technology (i.e. a hearing aid or cochlear implant), an audiologist can conduct a hearing test with and without the assistive technology. The difference between the thresholds with the assistive technology, which are expected to be lower, are then subtracted from the thresholds without any aid to calculate the patient’s functional gain, or how much their hearing is being improved by said technology. This technique informs the audiologist of how well the assistive technology is aiding the patient’s hearing, detection, and localization of sound.

===== Causes of Hearing Loss =====
Hearing impairment may also be the result of certain diseases such as CMV or Ménière's disease and these can be diagnosed from the shape of the audiogram. Otosclerosis results in an audiogram with significant loss at all frequencies, often of around 40 dB(HL). A deficiency particularly around 2 kHz (termed a Carhart notch in the audiogram) is characteristic of either otosclerosis or a congenital ossicular anomaly. Ménière's disease results in a severe loss at low frequencies.

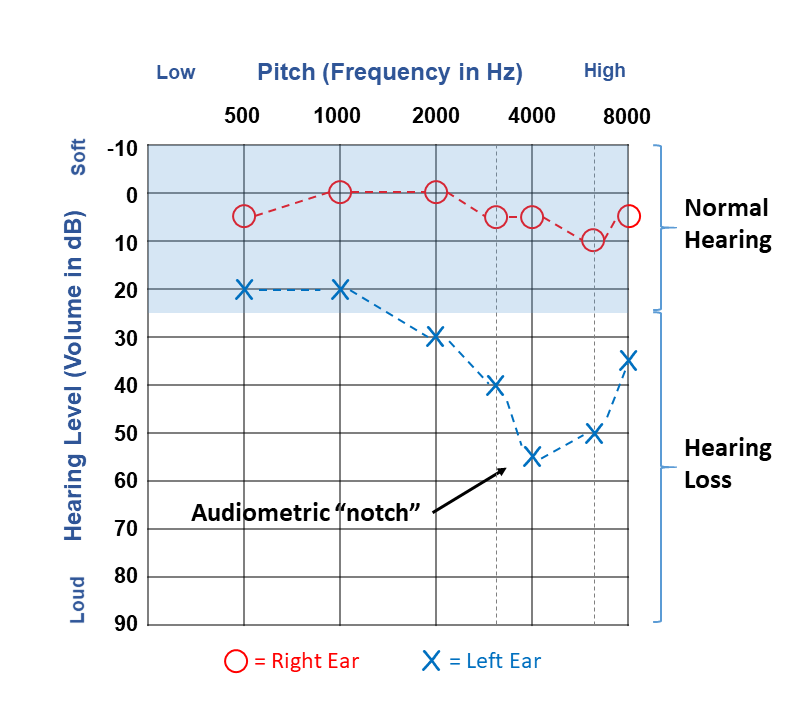
Audiogram showing a typical "noise notch" in the left ear (typical hearing in the right ear)

The configuration of thresholds on an audiogram can often help determine the cause(s) of the hearing loss. For example, aging typically leads to hearing thresholds which get poorer as test frequencies get higher. Noise induced hearing loss is typically characterized by a "notch" in the audiogram, with the poorest threshold occurring between 3000 and 6000 Hz (most often 4000 Hz) and better thresholds at lower and higher frequencies.

== Constraints ==
Audiograms are unable to measure hidden hearing loss, which is the inability to distinguish between sounds in loud environments such as restaurants. Hidden hearing loss is caused by synaptopathy in the cochlea, as opposed to sensorineural hearing loss caused by hair cell dysfunction. Audiograms are designed to "estimate the softest sounds the patient can detect", and are not reflective of the loud situations that cause difficulties for people with hidden hearing loss. Audiograms may not reflect losses of nerve fibers that respond to loud sounds, key to understanding speech in noisy environments. There are a number of other measures, such as electrocochleography, speech-in-noise perception, and frequency following response, may be more useful.

== See also ==
- Hearing range
- Equal-loudness contour
- Minimum audibility curve
- Articulation index
- Pure tone audiometry
- Hearing (sense)
- Audiology
- Audiometry
- A-weighting
