= Harold Burris-Meyer =

American scientist

Professor Harold Burris-Meyer
- Born: 1902; Madison, New Jersey, U.S.
- Died: September 27, 1984 (aged 81–82); Boca Raton, Florida, U.S.
- Citizenship: United States
- Education: City College of New York; Columbia University
- Known for: Acoustical advances in theater and warfare, R&D in psychoacoustics, Mood music
- Spouse: Anita M. Burris-Meyer
- Scientific career
- Fields: acoustics research, psychoacoustics
- Workplaces: Stevens Institute of Technology; Florida Atlantic University

Harold Burris-Meyer (1902-September 27, 1984) was a twentieth century American scientist who investigated the use of sound as a tool for emotional and physiological control and played a critical role in the emerging fields of sound design for theater, productivity music for industry, and applied psychoacoustics for warfare. He was a professor at the Stevens Institute of Technology, in Hoboken, New Jersey. He was also an author, a U.S. Navy commander, and a theatrical consultant.

During a long and varied career, Burris-Meyer worked at the Muzak Corporation, directed the first stereophonic recordings for Bell Labs in 1941, experimented with the Vocoder, and served as sound designer on thirteen Broadway shows, as well as on productions for the Metropolitan Opera and the Federal Theater Project.

Burris-Meyer pioneered the use of "infrasound (sound with a frequency below the lower limit of human audibility)" in theater settings to "manipulate audiences' emotions subconsciously," wrote historian Prof. Gascia Ouzounian. "Following a demonstration [by Burris-Meyer] of 'subsonics' in 1935, journalists speculated on the possibilities of mind control and mass hysteria."

== Education and academic affiliations ==
Burris-Meyer was awarded a Bachelor of Science degree from the City College of New York in 1923 and a Master of Arts from Columbia University in 1926.

In his 25-year tenure at Stevens, Burris-Meyer served as Professor of Dramatic Arts, Director of Research in Sound in the Theater, and Director of the Stevens Theater. From 1964 to 1972, he was a professor of Communications and Theater Director at Florida Atlantic University (FAU), and then a Professor Emeritus. He was awarded a Doctorate of Humane Letters from FAU in 1980.

== Early research on sound to effect emotions ==
Burris-Meyer was reportedly influenced by the work of American physicist Harvey Fletcher, who worked at Bell Telephone Laboratories and was known as the "father of stereophonic sound". During the early 1930s, Burris-Meyer became a consultant at Bell when the company was experimenting with stereophonic sound transmission, including tests with live orchestras. He engineered the stereo soundtrack for Walt Disney's 1940 film Fantasia.

He developed techniques to use sound to manipulate human emotions, particularly in theatrical settings. Burris-Meyer "has been working for years to put the control of sound in the drama on a scientific basis," said a June, 1940 article in The New York Times. "If he had his way, speech, prop sounds, background music, beating of hoofs, thunder, whatever the dramatist demands, would be scored and 'played' from a control board just as if it were a musical composition. ... [H]e has gone far in showing that it is as feasible to make and control sound as it is to make and control light." Burris-Meyer told the Times, "We have tried to control sound so that the artist in the theatre can use it to make a good show. ... [T]he limitations on the auditory component of the show are off. The players may speak with the tongues of men and of angels. With sound you can compel the audience to laugh, to weep. You can knock them off their seats, you can lay them in the aisles."

== Music for mood manipulation ==
From 1938 through 1947 Burris-Meyer served as a consultant, Vice President, and board member at Muzak Corporation, where he embarked on research to relieve boredom and fatigue through the subliminal use of mood-enhancing music. He produced a series of research reports which helped develop the "Stimulus Progression System, which defines what the Muzak brand is for decades to come," said Ted Houghtaling, Archivist & Digital Projects Librarian at Stevens Institute of Technology. "The system is essentially a method for counteracting worker fatigue and boredom. A lot of studies done by Burris-Meyer and Richard Cardinale at Stevens led to the creation of this system. … We have hundreds of these different research reports. All of them claim to prove, using hard data, that sound and music can be used to improve mood, boost morale, decrease fatigue, and increase productivity through the use of controlled sound."

His work with mood music was spotlighted in a 1942 Time magazine article, which said:

Professor Harold Burris-Meyer, director of research in sound at Stevens Institute of Technology, released results of elaborate tests with factory music from Bach to boogie-woogie. Once, in a big Philadelphia laundry, his experiments were so shattering that one worker burst into tears and ran home. But his overall findings show that scientifically planned music increases factory production by 1.3 to 11.1% … Such programs have been found to produce speed and contentment in such diverse establishments as the Lockheed plane plant and Manhattan's National City Bank. In the editorial rooms of the Reader's Digest editors are treated with twelve to 20 minutes of planned harmony every hour.

== Work with U.S. military ==
During World War II, Burris-Meyer was a member of the U.S. War Department Planning Board, and served in the U.S. Navy, reaching the rank of commander. Under National Defense Research Committee sponsorship, he led a program at Stevens which studied potential military applications of sound control and psychoacoustics. One outgrowth of this program was the development of Project Polly, an aircraft that blared speech from a mile up; it was used behind enemy lines to encourage peaceful surrenders.

Burris-Meyer also served as a reserve officer and consultant with the U.S. Defense Department during the Korea and Vietnam wars.

== Books ==
He was co-author (with Edward Cole) of Scenery for the Theatre (Little, Brown, 1938); author of Theatres and Auditoriums (Reinhold, 1949); co-author (with Lewis S. Goodfriend) of Acoustics for the Architect (Reinhold, 1957); and co-author (with Vincent Mallory) of Sound for the Theater (Radio Magazines, Inc., 1959).

== Resources ==
Burris-Meyer's professional papers are catalogued at the Archives & Special Collections department at the Samuel C. Williams Library at the Stevens Institute of Technology. Further papers are housed at the Massachusetts Institute of Technology Library.
