= Articulation Index =

Method of measuring hearing loss

In audiology, the Articulation Index (AI) is a tool used to predict the amount of speech that is audible to a patient with a specific hearing loss. The AI figure for a given patient can range from zero to one, representing the proportion of the average speech signal that is audible. The closer the AI is to one, or 100 percent, the better the person should be able to hear speech. The calculation is also used in industrial settings for the design of safety devices, such as flight helmets, where audio signals are required to be clearly heard.

== Clinical use ==
The AI is often used as a counseling tool since it presents an individual's hearing loss in terms of percentage of speech that is audible during a typical one-on-one conversation. The AI can also be used to measure the effectiveness of hearing aids and other forms of amplification devices.

Since the creation of the AI, there have been several proposed ways to simplify and increase its use. In 1990, Gustav Mueller and Mead Killion proposed an AI calculation involving one hundred dots on an audiogram, each of which represented an important speech frequency; the proportion of dots audible to the listener estimates the patient's AI. Unfortunately, not all areas on the audiogram (taking into account frequencies and intensity levels) are equally weighted. According to this procedure, the highest density of the audiogram dots is concentrated in the frequency region of 1-3 kHz, since this is the region containing the most speech information.

== Industrial use ==
In many industrial settings noise exposure metrics have been established to quantify human exposure to sound. In aerospace settings the Speech Intelligibility Index (SII), published in 1986 by the American National Standards Institute, is a major revision of the AI standard and defines computational methods "that produce results highly correlated with the intelligibility of speech under a variety of adverse listening conditions, such as noise masking, filtering and reverberation".

== See also ==
- Absolute threshold of hearing
- Health effects from noise
- Active noise control

== Other sources ==
Amlani, A., Punch, J., and Ching, T. (2002), "Methods and Applications of the Audibility Index in Hearing Aid Selection and Fitting" in Trends in Amplification, 6(3), pp. 81–129:

Mueller, G. and Killion, M. (1990), "An Easy Method for Calculating the Articulation Index" in The Hearing Journal, 43(9), pp. 14–17:

French, N.R. and Steinberg, J.C. (1947), "Factors governing the intelligibility of speech sounds" in J Acoust Soc Am, 19, p. 90:

Kryter, K.D. (1962), "Methods for the calculation and use of the Articulation Index" in J Acoust Soc Am, 34(11): pp. 1689–1697.

Kryter, K.D. (1962), "Validation of the Articulation Index" in J Acoust Soc Am, 34(11): pp. 1668: .
