= Dog whistle =

Ultrasonic whistle for animals

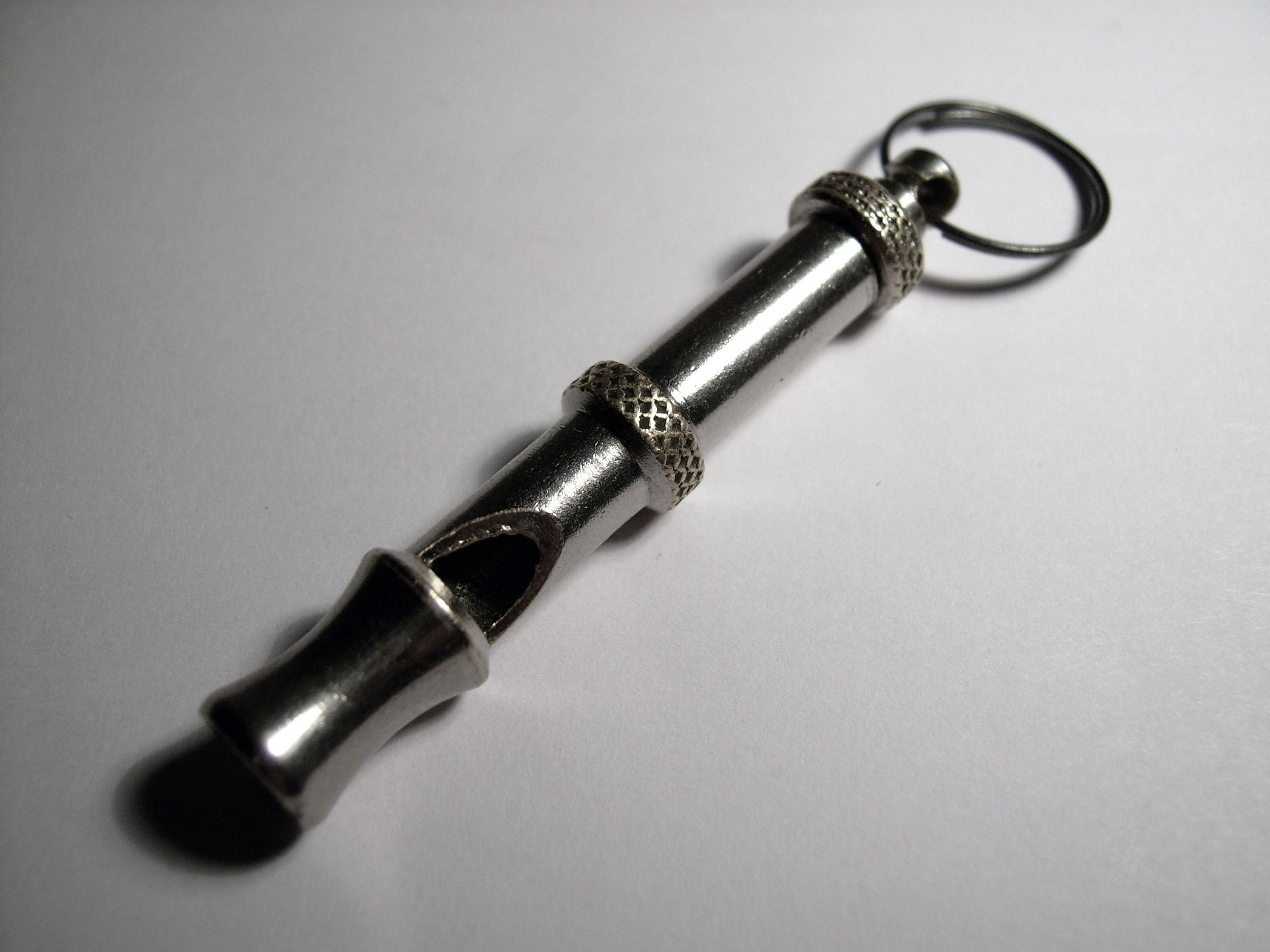
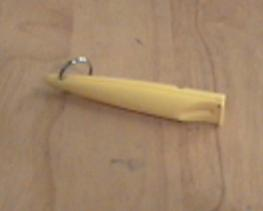
Dog whistles (left) adjustable, (right) fixed frequency

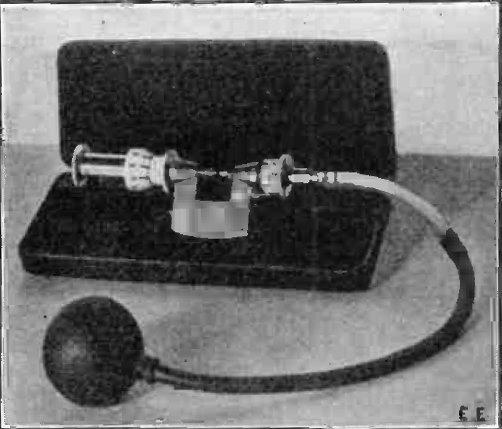
Galton whistle, the first "dog whistle"

A dog whistle (also known as silent whistle or Galton's whistle) is a type of whistle that emits sound in the ultrasonic range, which humans cannot hear but some animals can, including dogs and domestic cats, and is used in their training. It was invented in 1876 by Francis Galton and is mentioned in his book Inquiries into Human Faculty and Its Development, in which he describes experiments to test the range of frequencies that could be heard by various animals, such as a house cat. Dog whistles were invented to explore auditory perception in animals and have since evolved into tools primarily used for dog training, with commercial developments leading to more specialized and efficient designs. References to dog whistles also appear in children's media, including cartoons and educational programming, where they are used as examples in discussions about sound, hearing, or animal behavior.

== Origins ==
The origins of the dog whistle trace back to the late 19th century with the invention of the Galton whistle by Sir Francis Galton, a British polymath and half-cousin of Charles Darwin. Galton developed this device to study the range of frequencies audible to humans and animals, particularly dogs. The whistle emitted ultrasonic sounds beyond the upper limit of human hearing, allowing Galton to observe that smaller dogs could detect higher pitches than larger ones, and that cats responded to even higher frequencies, albeit with less enthusiasm. This innovation not only advanced the understanding of auditory perception but also laid the groundwork for the modern dog whistle used in training and communication with canines.

The upper limit of the human hearing range is about 20 kilohertz (kHz) for children, declining to 15–17 kHz for middle-age adults. The top end of a dog's hearing range is about 45 kHz, while a cat's is 64 kHz. It is thought that the wild ancestors of cats and dogs evolved this higher hearing range in order to hear high-frequency sounds made by their preferred prey, small rodents. The frequency of most dog whistles is within the range of 23 to 54 kHz, so they are above the range of human hearing, although some are adjustable down into the audible range.

To human ears, dog whistles only emit a quiet hissing sound. The principal advantage of dog whistles is that they do not produce a loud, potentially irritating noise for humans that a normal whistle would produce and thus can be used to train or command animals without disturbing nearby people. Some dog whistles have adjustable sliders for active control of the frequency produced. Trainers may use the whistle simply to get a dog's attention or to inflict pain for the purpose of behaviour modification.

== Modern use ==
The commercial development of the dog whistle led to the introduction of adjustable frequency whistles and more compact designs, making them a key tool for dog training. These innovations allow trainers to communicate with dogs over long distances using frequencies inaudible to humans. The effectiveness of dog whistles, however, varies depending on the breed and individual dog's response.

In addition to lung-powered whistles, there are also electronic dog whistle devices that emit ultrasonic sound via piezoelectric emitters. The electronic variety are sometimes coupled with bark-detection circuits in devices designed to curb barking behaviour.

== Criticism and concerns ==
Although dog whistles are designed to emit sounds that are generally inaudible to humans, some people report being able to hear high-pitched frequencies produced by certain models, especially younger individuals or those with sensitive hearing. This can result in discomfort, headaches, or ear irritation.

In addition, some animal welfare advocates have raised concerns about the misuse of dog whistles, particularly if used at excessive volumes or frequencies that may cause distress or confusion in dogs and other animals. Inappropriate use of ultrasonic devices for behavior correction has also been criticized as potentially aversive or inhumane when used without proper training or understanding.

Due to these concerns, some pet owners and trainers prefer alternative methods of communication and recall, such as clickers, verbal cues, or visual hand signals.

== In popular culture ==
Dog whistles have been featured in a range of media to demonstrate the difference between human and canine hearing, such as the animated television series The Simpsons, Family Guy, and the 1997 film Men in Black.

== See also ==
- Animal training
- Dog behavior
- Ultrasound
- Hearing range
- Dog communication
- Clicker training
- Francis Galton
