= Doppler shift compensation =

When an echolocating bat approaches a target, its outgoing sounds return as echoes, which are Doppler shifted upward in frequency. In certain species of bats, which produce constant frequency (CF) echolocation calls, the bats compensate for the Doppler shift by changing their call frequency as they change speed towards a target. This keeps the returning echo in the same frequency range as the normal echolocation call. This dynamic frequency modulation is called the Doppler shift compensation (DSC), and was discovered by Hans Schnitzler in 1968.

CF bats employ the DSC mechanism to maintain the echo frequency within a narrow frequency range. This narrow frequency range is referred to as the acoustic fovea. By modulating the frequency of the outgoing calls, the bats can ensure that the returning echoes stay nearly constant within this range of optimal sensitivity. Ultimately, by keeping the echoes in this optimal range, the bats can quickly ascertain certain properties (such as distance and velocity) about the target.

This behavior appears to have evolved independently in several species of the Rhinolophidae and Mormoopidae families. The common features shared by bats with DSC are that they produce CF sounds, and that they have a specialized cochlea that is adapted to receiving a narrow range of frequencies with high resolution. DSC allows these bats to utilize these features to optimize the echolocation behavior.

== Description ==
All bats, when there is some nonzero relative velocity between itself and the target (the object that the call rebounds off, which produces an echo), will hear Doppler shifted echoes of the pulses they produce. If the bat and the target are approaching each other, the bat will hear an echo that is higher in frequency than the call it produced. If they are moving away from each other, the bat will hear an echo that is lower in frequency than the call it originally produced. It is important that the bat be able to detect and be extremely sensitive to these echoes, so that it can determine properties about the target object.

For CF bats, who possess an acoustic fovea, the Doppler shifted echo will fall outside of the narrow range of frequencies to which the bat is optimally responsive. This problem can be avoided if the frequency of the calls produced is altered. As the bat speeds up and approaches a target, the echoes it hears will be of increasingly high pitch, outside of the auditory fovea. In order to compensate for the Doppler shift during an approach toward an object of interest, the bat will lower the frequency of the calls it produces. The overall effect is that the echo frequency maintains nearly constant, and remains steadily within the auditory fovea. By lowering pulse frequency by the same increment that the Doppler shift will raise the echo frequency, the bat can maintain the frequency of the echoes around a constant value, within the auditory fovea. This was measured using a small, portable microphone (the Telemike) on the top of the bat's head to record the echo frequencies heard by the bat.

== Bat echolocation calls ==
Bats can either produce echolocation calls of a constant frequency or that are frequency modulated. DSC is a unique strategy employed by constant frequency (CF) bats, which exclusively produce CF calls. These bats have a narrowly defined range of frequencies over which they are maximally sensitive, which is termed the acoustic fovea.

=== Constant frequency vs. frequency modulated pulses ===
DSC is only found in CF bats. This is because they have a narrow range of frequencies to which they are optimally sensitive, and have a specialized cochlea that is adapted to responding to one frequency with high resolution. DSC however is not employed by frequency-modulated, or FM, bats. These bats have a broad range of frequencies to which they are maximally sensitive, and thus do not need to tightly modulate the echo frequency. For FM bats, the frequency of the Doppler shifted echoes still falls within their range of auditory responsiveness. Hence, they do not need a DSC mechanism to optimize their echolocation behavior.

FM bats produce short pulses, often less than 5 ms in duration, that contain a broad range of frequencies covering up to 80–100 kHz. Bats use FM pulses to determine target distance, by using the delay between multiple emitted pulses and their returning echoes to calculate range. In CF-FM bats, a short, upward FM sweep precedes the long, CF component of the pulse. The pulse is then terminated with a short, downward FM sweep. Bats that produce these types of compound signals still use the DSC to modulate the frequency of the returning echoes, due to the CF component of the pulse. These pulses are best suited for the precise determination of target distance.

CF pulses are long pulses that are 10–100 ms in duration, which consist of a single component of a relatively constant frequency. These types of pulses are produced by CF bats, and are also incorporated into the calls of CF-FM bats, which produce compound pulses that contain both CF and FM elements. The CF pulse is preceded by a short, upward FM sweep, and is terminated by a brief, downward FM sweep. The second harmonic of the CF-FM pulse is typically the dominant (highest amplitude) sound, and is usually about 80 kHz. The fundamental frequency of the pulse is usually about 40 kHz, and is of a lower amplitude than the second harmonic. These types of echolocation pulses afford the bat the ability to classify, detect flutter (e.g. the fluttering wings of insects), and determine velocity information about the target. Both CF and CF-FM bats use the Doppler shift compensation mechanism in order to maximize the efficiency of their echolocation behavior.

A bat's hearing is especially sensitive to sounds that have similar frequencies to its own echolocation pulses. The resting call pulses of CF and CF-FM bats are largely characterized by notes of a single frequency, while the resting calls of FM bats span an extensive range of frequencies. Stated differently, CF bats produce narrow bandwidth sounds, or sounds over a restricted range of frequencies. Contrastingly, FM bats produce broad bandwidth pulses, which contain a wide range of frequencies. It follows that CF bats have auditory systems that are highly sensitive to a limited range of frequencies, while the auditory systems of FM bats are sensitive to a vast range of frequencies.

=== The acoustic fovea ===
==== Illustration ====
The original figure found in Metzner, Zhang, and Smotherman (2002)

This plot shows behavioral threshold, in decibels, vs. frequency, in kilohertz, obtained from the greater horseshoe bat (Rhinolophus ferrumequinum). In other words, on the y-axis is the threshold for which the bat will show a response, with a lower number indicating that the bat is more responsive (e.g. more sensitive) to a particular frequency. The very sharp tuning curve, which is shown by the short bar below the graph, shows that the bat is maximally responsive to an extremely narrow range of frequencies. This sharp tuning curve is referred to as the acoustic, or auditory, fovea, and is demarcated on the plot by the short bar beneath the graph.

==== Description ====
As described in the previous section, a bat's hearing is especially sensitive to sounds that have similar frequencies to its natural echolocation pulses. In the case of a CF bat (such as the greater horseshoe bat), the narrow bandwidth of the frequencies contained within the pulse is reflected within the narrow range of frequencies to which the bat is optimally sensitive (which is shown in the tuning curve above). CF bats’ auditory systems are finely tuned to the narrowband frequencies in the calls they produce. This results in a sharp acoustic fovea, as illustrated in the audiogram above.

The disproportionate number of receptors in the cochlea that respond to frequencies within a narrow range ultimately gives rise to the acoustic fovea. This cochlear morphology is the anatomical correlate of the acoustic fovea. As a result, bats are able to respond preferentially to sounds of these frequencies.

==== Function of acoustic fovea ====
The specificity of the auditory system is proportional to the range of frequencies found in the resting call frequency (RF) of the bat. Therefore, the narrow range of frequencies found within the RF of a CF bat is reflected in the sharp sensitivity of the auditory system (the auditory fovea).

FM bats do not possess an acoustic fovea, because the broad range of frequencies in the RF does not lend itself to the formation of a sharply tuned auditory system. Rather, the vast range of frequencies in the resting call is reflected in the extensive range of frequencies to which an FM bat is responsive. Conversely, the narrow, well-defined span of frequencies within CF element of the CF pulses is reflected in the auditory system's sharp range of optimal sensitivity (e.g. a fovea).

Evolutionarily, this proportionality between the tuning of the auditory system and the natural frequencies within the resting bat's calls is logical. It is advantageous to be maximally responsive to the frequencies found within the calls of conspecifics, and it follows that the frequencies found within conspecific calls is mimicked by the frequencies in one's own call. Thus, the narrow, well-defined span of frequencies within CF pulses is reflected in the auditory system's sharp range of optimal sensitivity (e.g. a fovea).

=== Which species have DSC? ===
CF bats use the DSC, to maintain a constant echo frequency. Bats of the families Rhinolophidae, Hipposideridae, and some species within Mormoopidae employ the DSC to modulate the echo frequency. The Doppler shift compensation mechanism appears to have evolved independently in these families. Species within these families include those of the genus Rhinolophus, such as Rhinolophus ferrumequinum (the greater horseshoe bat), in the family Rhinolophidae, and those of the genus Pteronotus, in the family Mormoopidae. Bats of the genus Pteronotus include P. parnellii (Parnell's mustached bat, discovered by Suga et al., 1975) and P. personatus (Wagner's mustached bat).

== Feedback control of call frequency ==
In order to maintain the echo frequency around a constant value for optimal hearing, the bat must dynamically modulate the frequency of the pulses it emits. This is done rapidly in the naturally behaving animal, and is accomplished by making a series of small changes to the call frequency upon receiving auditory feedback in the form of an echo. These small changes are produced between, not within, calls. The bat produces a call, listens for the returning echo, and makes a small, step-wise adjustment in the frequency of its next pulse. By making small changes to the frequency of each call, and increasing the overall rate of pulses produced, the bat is able to rapidly attend to ongoing auditory feedback and use that information to accurately stabilize the echo frequency around a constant value. Making large changes in call frequency without increasing the call rate leads to a risk that the bat will overcompensate for the Doppler shift, which will also result in the echoes falling outside of the auditory fovea. By making a series of small, rapid changes to call frequency, the Doppler shift can be acutely compensated for, without the echo frequency falling outside of the acoustic fovea. This mechanism of feedback control ultimately optimizes speed, accuracy, and overall stability of the DSC in the animal's natural context.

== Function of the Doppler shift compensation mechanism ==
By continually decreasing the frequency of the emitted pulses as the target is approached (and the velocity of the bat with respect to the target is increased), the Doppler shifted echoes are dynamically maintained at a nearly constant frequency within the acoustic fovea. This allows the bat to perform neural computations about the target properties and target distance, because it is the most sensitive to the frequency that the echo is maintained at. The function of this echo frequency modulation thus is to optimize the resulting processing of the echo. By keeping the echo within the range that the bat is the most sensitive to, the bat can quickly pick up on the echo and process it for the relevant target information

In this way, the bat modulates something that is relatively easy to control (the pulses it produces) while maintaining neural machinery that is sensitive to only a narrow range of frequencies. If the bat consistently produced the same pulse frequency as it approached the target, the echoes would increase way beyond this narrow range of sensitivity. This would result in the need for neural machinery that is extremely sensitive to a very wide range of frequencies, and more complicated neural computations. These computations would entail a very specific determination of the exact change in the echo frequency relative to the expected echo frequency, and then that information would somehow need to be related to the properties and distance of the target. On the other hand, simply detecting the change that is made to the pulse frequency and relating that to target properties is a lot simpler, in terms of a neural computation. Therefore, the overall function of the DSC is to allow echoes to be analyzed within a narrow range of optimal sensitivity, which ultimately reduces the computational strain on the bat's nervous system.

== Neural pathway ==
Neurons of the midbrain tegmentum of the CF-FM bat brain have been implicated in the DSC mechanism. Neurons of the tegmentum have firing properties that make them strong candidates for regulating DSC. The neuronal response in the tegmentum is dependent on the time delay between an auditory stimulus and the subsequent feedback, and the neurons only respond to paired stimuli that occur in DSC.

Later work has revealed that the parabrachial nuclei (PB), a different region of the midbrain, is the neural substrate for DSC and auditory feedback regulation of pulse frequency. When neurons of the PB are inhibited via exogenous drug administration (e.g. using muscimol, the GABAA agonist, or CNQX, an AMPA antagonist), the pulse frequencies emitted at rest and in flight (during DSC) were lowered. Conversely, when the area was excited via exogenous drug administration (e.g. using BMI, the GABAA antagonist, or AMPA to cause excitation), the resting call frequency was increased, and there was a severely reduced or completely abolished response to auditory feedback of increased frequency. The magnitude and specificity of these results suggest that the PB is directly involved in the integration of auditory and vocal stimuli, and is involved in neural regulation of call frequency, because manipulations in the area drastically affected pulse frequency. This is suggestive of a midbrain network of control of call parameters, that functions in parallel to and independently of cortical control of pulse parameters.

== Advantages of the Doppler shift compensation mechanism in biosonar systems ==
This mechanism allows for the reduction of neural computational load (as described in the "Function of the Doppler Shift Compensation Mechanism" section). In biosonar, instead of having the animal be highly sensitive to every frequency and then compute the target properties from a wide range of echo frequencies, the animals control something that is relatively easy to modulate- the frequency of the emitted pulses. The resulting neural computation is much simpler to perform; the bat only needs to detect the feedback regulated changes that it actively makes to its pulses, and how this relates to target distance and target properties. Artificial sonar systems are less effective and employ the opposite strategy. They produce only one pulse frequency, and must detect a wide range of echo frequencies in order to calculate information about the environment. This results in a more complicated echolocation computation, in which there is a need to compute now how deviations of the echo frequencies relate to target properties. Such a sonar mechanism increases computational strain on the system, and reduces its overall effectiveness.
