= Absolute threshold of hearing =

Minimum sound level that an average human can hear

The absolute threshold of hearing (ATH), also known as the absolute hearing threshold or auditory threshold, is the minimum sound level of a pure tone that an average human ear with normal hearing can hear with no other sound present. The absolute threshold relates to the sound that can just be heard by the organism. The absolute threshold is not a discrete point and is therefore classed as the point at which a sound elicits a response a specified percentage of the time.

The threshold of hearing is generally reported in reference to the RMS sound pressure of 20 micropascals, i.e. 0 dB SPL, corresponding to a sound intensity of 0.98 pW/m^{2} at 1 atmosphere and 25 °C. It is approximately the quietest sound a young human with undamaged hearing can detect at 1 kHz. The threshold of hearing is frequency-dependent and it has been shown that the ear's sensitivity is best at frequencies between 2 kHz and 5 kHz, where the threshold reaches as low as −9 dB SPL.

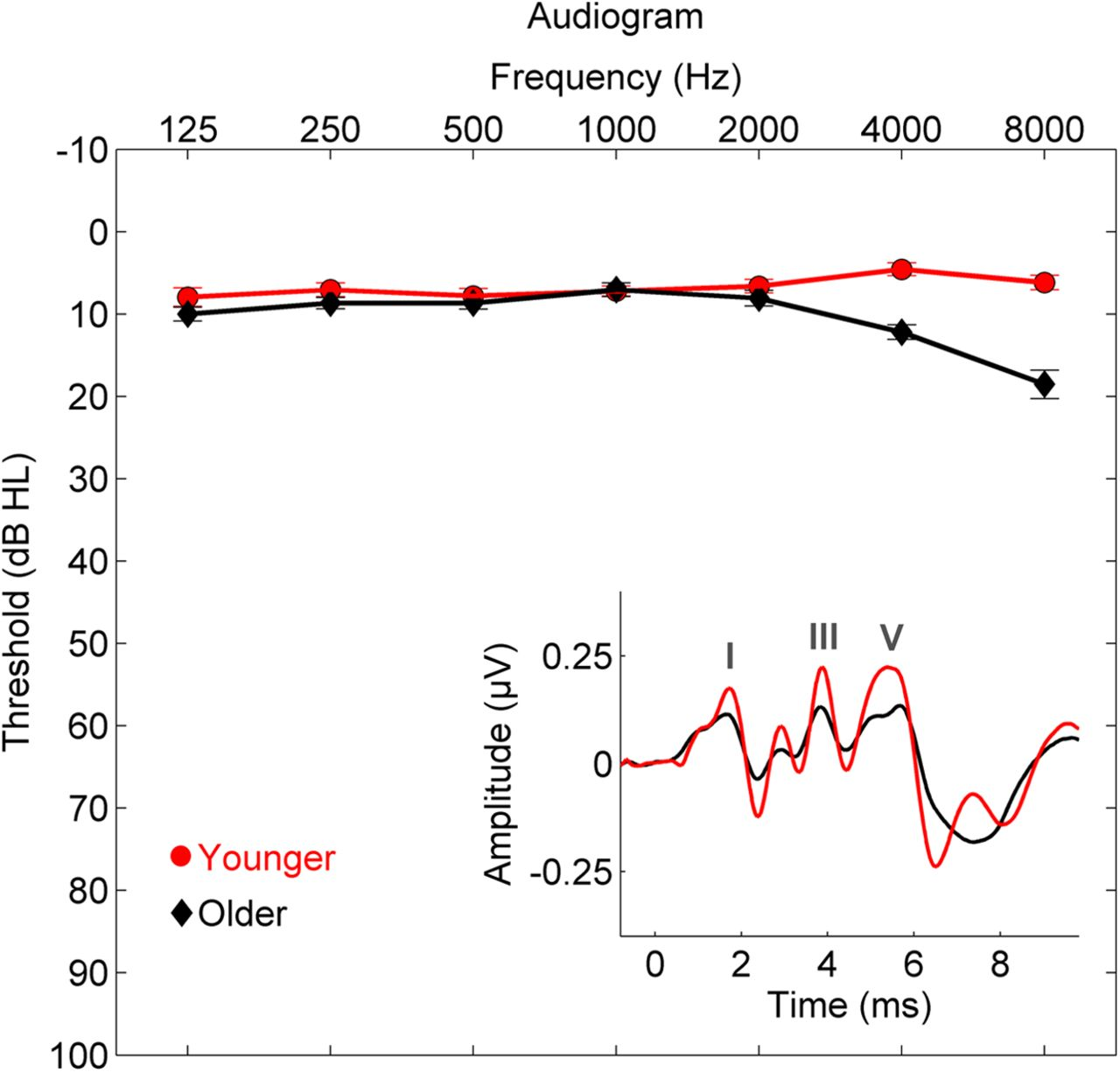
Average hearing thresholds in decibels (SPL) (the unit of 'dB(HL)' shown on the vertical axis is incorrect) are plotted from 125 to 8000 Hz for younger (18-30 year olds, red circles) and older adults (60-67 year olds, black diamonds). The hearing of older adults is shown to be significantly less sensitive than that of younger adults at frequencies of 4000 and 8000 Hz.

== Psychophysical methods for measuring thresholds ==
Measurement of the absolute hearing threshold provides some basic information about our auditory system. The tools used to collect such information are called psychophysical methods. Through these, the perception of a physical stimulus (sound) and our psychological response to the sound is measured.

Several psychophysical methods can measure absolute threshold. These vary, but certain aspects are identical. Firstly, the test defines the stimulus and specifies the manner in which the subject should respond. The test presents the sound to the listener and manipulates the stimulus level in a predetermined pattern. The absolute threshold is defined statistically, often as an average of all obtained hearing thresholds.

Some procedures use a series of trials, with each trial using the 'single-interval "yes"/"no" paradigm'. This means that sound may be present or absent in the single interval, and the listener has to say whether they thought the stimulus was there. When the interval does not contain a stimulus, it is called a "catch trial".

=== Classical methods ===
Classical methods date back to the 19th century and were first described by Gustav Theodor Fechner in his work Elements of Psychophysics. Three methods are traditionally used for testing a subject's perception of a stimulus: the method of limits, the method of constant stimuli, and the method of adjustment.

Series of descending and ascending runs in Method of Limits

Method of limits
In the method of limits, the tester controls the level of the stimuli. Single-interval yes/no paradigm' is used, but there are no catch trials.

The trial uses several series of descending and ascending runs.

The trial starts with the descending run, where a stimulus is presented at a level well above the expected threshold. When the subject responds correctly to the stimulus, the level of intensity of the sound is decreased by a specific amount and presented again. The same pattern is repeated until the subject stops responding to the stimuli, at which point the descending run is finished.

In the ascending run, which comes after, the stimulus is first presented well below the threshold and then gradually increased in two decibel (dB) steps until the subject responds. As there are no clear margins to 'hearing' and 'not hearing', the threshold for each run is determined as the midpoint between the last audible and first inaudible level.

The subject's absolute hearing threshold is calculated as the mean of all obtained thresholds in both ascending and descending runs.

There are several issues related to the method of limits. First is anticipation, which is caused by the subject's awareness that the turn-points determine a change in response. Anticipation produces better ascending thresholds and worse descending thresholds.

Habituation creates completely opposite effect, and occurs when the subject becomes accustomed to responding either "yes" in the descending runs and/or "no" in the ascending runs. For this reason, thresholds are raised in ascending runs and lowered in descending runs.

Another problem may be related to step size. Too large a step compromises accuracy of the measurement as the actual threshold may be just between two stimulus levels.

Finally, since the tone is always present, "yes" is always the correct answer.

Method of constant stimuli
In the method of constant stimuli, the tester sets the level of stimuli and presents them at completely random order.

Subject responding "yes"/"no" after each presentation

Thus, there are no ascending or descending trials.

The subject responds "yes"/"no" after each presentation.

The stimuli are presented many times at each level and the threshold is defined as the stimulus level at which the subject scored 50% correct. "Catch" trials may be included in this method.

Method of constant stimuli has several advantages over the method of limits. Firstly, the random order of stimuli means that the correct answer cannot be predicted by the listener. Secondarily, as the tone may be absent (catch trial), "yes" is not always the correct answer. Finally, catch trials help to detect the amount of a listener's guessing.
The main disadvantage lies in the large number of trials needed to obtain the data, and therefore time required to complete the test.

Method of adjustment
Method of adjustment shares some features with the method of limits, but differs in others. There are descending and ascending runs and the listener knows that the stimulus is always present.

The subject reduces or increase the level of the tone

However, unlike in the method of limits, here the stimulus is controlled by the listener. The subject reduces the level of the tone until it cannot be detected anymore, or increases until it can be heard again.

The stimulus level is varied continuously via a dial and the stimulus level is measured by the tester at the end. The threshold is the mean of the just audible and just inaudible levels.

Also this method can produce several biases. To avoid giving cues about the actual stimulus level, the dial must be unlabeled. Apart from the already mentioned anticipation and habituation, stimulus persistence (preservation) could influence the result from the method of adjustment.

In the descending runs, the subject may continue to reduce the level of the sound as if the sound was still audible, even though the stimulus is already well below the actual hearing threshold.

In contrast, in the ascending runs, the subject may have persistence of the absence of the stimulus until the hearing threshold is passed by certain amount.

=== Forced-choice methods ===
Two intervals are presented to a listener, one with a tone and one without a tone. The listener must decide which interval had the tone in it. The number of intervals can be increased, but this may cause problems for the listener who has to remember which interval contained the tone.

=== Adaptive methods ===
Unlike the classical methods, where the pattern for changing the stimuli is preset, in adaptive methods the subject's response to the previous stimuli determines the level at which a subsequent stimulus is presented.

==== Staircase (up-down) methods ====
Series of descending and ascending trials runs and turning points

The simple 1-down-1-up method consists of a series of descending and ascending trial runs and turning points (reversals). The stimulus level is increased if the subject does not respond and decreased when a response occurs. Similar to the method of limits, the stimuli are adjusted in predetermined steps. After obtaining from six to eight reversals, the first one is discarded and the threshold is defined as the average of the midpoints of the remaining runs. Experiments have shown that this method provides only 50% accuracy. To produce more accurate results, this simple method can be further modified by increasing the size of steps in the descending runs, e.g. 2-down-1-up method, 3-down-1-up methods.

==== Bekesy's tracking method ====
The threshold being tracked by the listener

Bekesy's method contains some aspects of classical methods and staircase methods. The level of the stimulus is automatically varied at a fixed rate. The subject is asked to press a button when the stimulus is detectable. Once the button is pressed, the level is automatically decreased by the motor-driven attenuator and increased when the button is not pushed. The threshold is thus tracked by the listeners, and calculated as the mean of the midpoints of the runs as recorded by the automat.

== Hysteresis effect ==
Descending runs give better hearing thresholds than ascending runs

Hysteresis can be defined roughly as 'the lagging of an effect behind its cause'. When measuring hearing thresholds it is always easier for the subject to follow a tone that is audible and decreasing in amplitude than to detect a tone that was previously inaudible.

This is because 'top-down' influences mean that the subject expects to hear the sound and is, therefore, more motivated with higher levels of concentration.

The 'bottom-up' theory explains that unwanted external (from the environment) and internal (e.g., heartbeat) noise results in the subject only responding to the sound if the signal-to-noise ratio is above a certain point.

In practice this means that when measuring threshold with sounds decreasing in amplitude, the point at which the sound becomes inaudible is always lower than the point at which it returns to audibility. This phenomenon is known as the 'hysteresis effect'.

== Psychometric function of absolute hearing threshold ==
Psychometric function 'represents the probability of a certain listener's response as a function of the magnitude of the particular sound characteristic being studied'.

To give an example, this could be the probability curve of the subject detecting a sound being presented as a function of the sound level. When the stimulus is presented to the listener one would expect that the sound would either be audible or inaudible, resulting in a 'doorstep' function. In reality a grey area exists where the listener is uncertain as to whether they have actually heard the sound or not, so their responses are inconsistent, resulting in a psychometric function.

The psychometric function is a sigmoid function characterised by being 's' shaped in its graphical representation.

== Minimal audible field vs minimal audible pressure ==
Two methods can be used to measure the minimal audible stimulus and therefore the absolute threshold of hearing. Minimal audible field involves the subject sitting in a sound field and stimulus being presented via a loudspeaker. The sound level is then measured at the position of the subject's head with the subject not in the sound field. Minimal audible pressure involves presenting stimuli via headphones or earphones and measuring sound pressure in the subject's ear canal using a very small probe microphone. The two different methods produce different thresholds and minimal audible field thresholds are often 6 to 10 dB better than minimal audible pressure thresholds. It is thought that this difference is due to:

- monaural vs binaural hearing. With minimal audible field both ears are able to detect the stimuli but with minimal audible pressure only one ear is able to detect the stimuli. Binaural hearing is more sensitive than monaural hearing/
- physiological noises heard when ear is occluded by an earphone during minimal audible pressure measurements. When the ear is covered the subject hears body noises, such as heart beat, and these may have a masking effect.

Minimal audible field and minimal audible pressure are important when considering calibration issues and they also illustrate that the human hearing is most sensitive in the 2–5 kHz range.

== Temporal summation ==
Temporal summation is the relationship between stimulus duration and intensity when the presentation time is less than 1 second. Auditory sensitivity changes when the duration of a sound becomes less than 1 second. The threshold intensity decreases by about 10 dB when the duration of a tone burst is increased from 20 to 200 ms.

For example, suppose that the quietest sound a subject can hear is 16 dB SPL if the sound is presented at a duration of 200 ms. If the same sound is then presented for a duration of only 20 ms, the quietest sound that can now be heard by the subject goes up to 26 dB SPL. In other words, if a signal is shortened by a factor of 10 then the level of that signal must be increased by as much as 10 dB to be heard by the subject.

The ear operates as an energy detector that samples the amount of energy present within a certain time frame. A certain amount of energy is needed within a time frame to reach the threshold. This can be done by using a higher intensity for less time or by using a lower intensity for more time. Sensitivity to sound improves as the signal duration increases up to about 200 to 300 ms, after that the threshold remains constant.

The timpani of the ear operates more as a sound pressure sensor. Also a microphone works the same way and is not sensitive to sound intensity.

== See also ==
- dB(A)
- Equal-loudness contour
- Hearing range
- Loudness
- Phon
- Psychoacoustics
- Psychophysics
- Signal detection theory
- Sone
