= Audiometer =

Machine used to evaluate hearing sensitivity

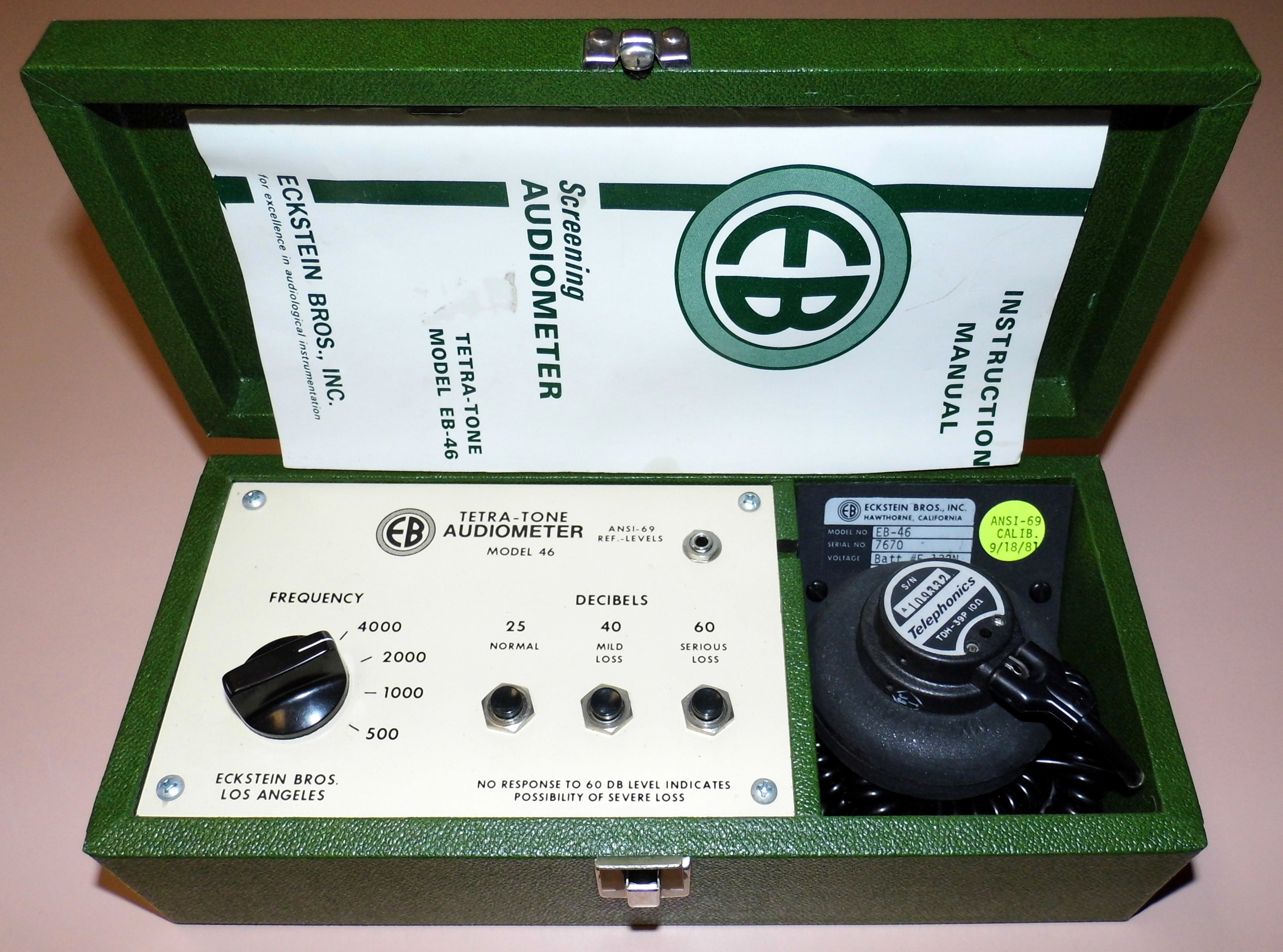
- Portable audiometer Tetra-Tone Model EB-46
- Purpose: evaluate hearing acuity

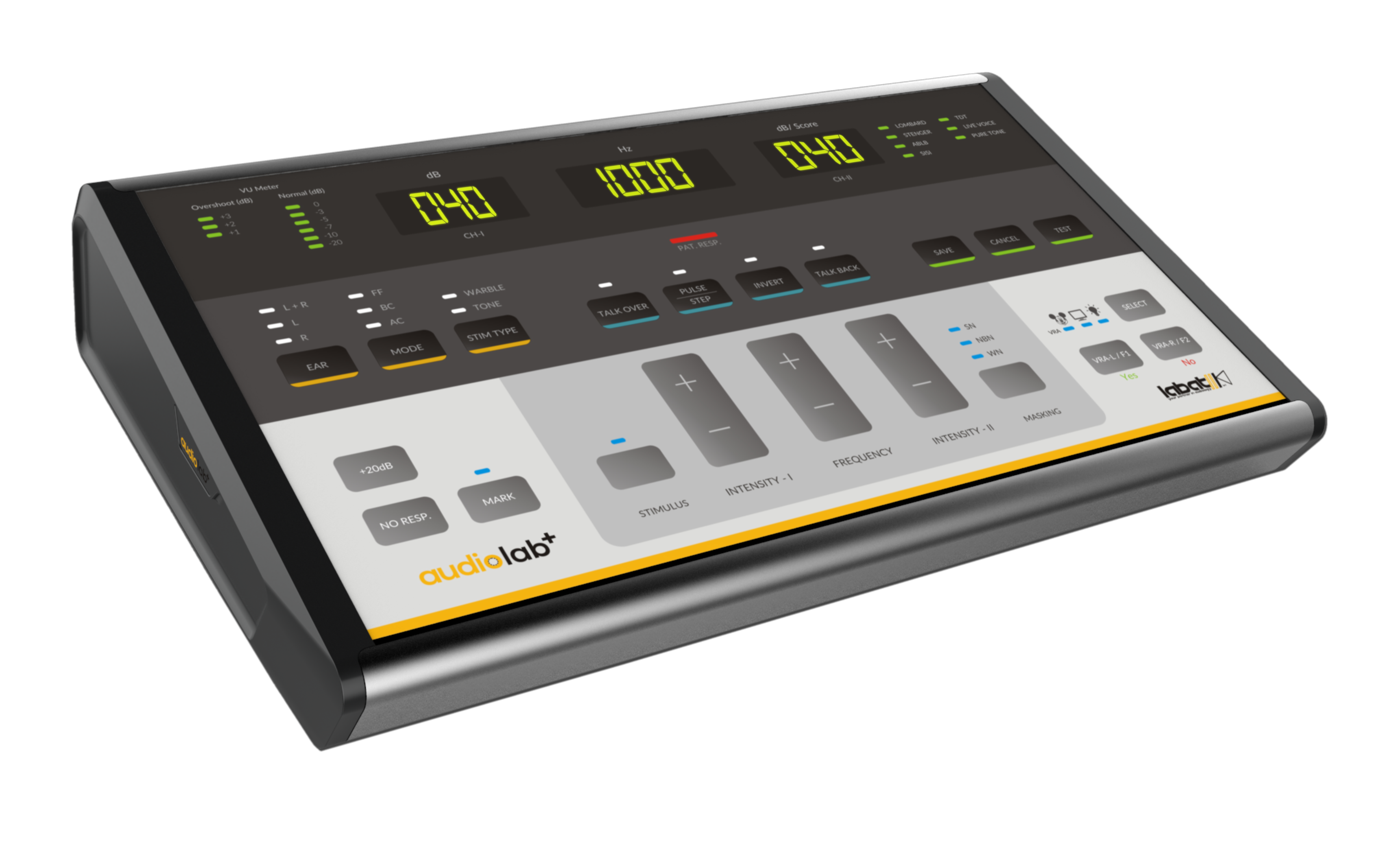
New age portable digital audiometer

An audiometer is a machine used for evaluating hearing acuity. They usually consist of an embedded hardware unit connected to a pair of headphones and a test subject feedback button, sometimes controlled by a standard PC. Such systems can also be used with bone vibrators to test conductive hearing mechanisms.

Audiometers are standard equipment at ear, nose and throat (ENT) clinics and in audiology centers. An alternative to hardware audiometers are software audiometers, which are available in many different configurations. Screening PC-based audiometers use a standard computer. Clinical PC-based audiometers are generally more expensive than software audiometers, but are much more accurate and efficient. They are most commonly used in hospitals, audiology centers and research communities. These audiometers are also used to conduct industrial audiometric testing. Some audiometers even provide a software developer's kit that provides researchers with the capability to create their own diagnostic tests.

== Functionality ==
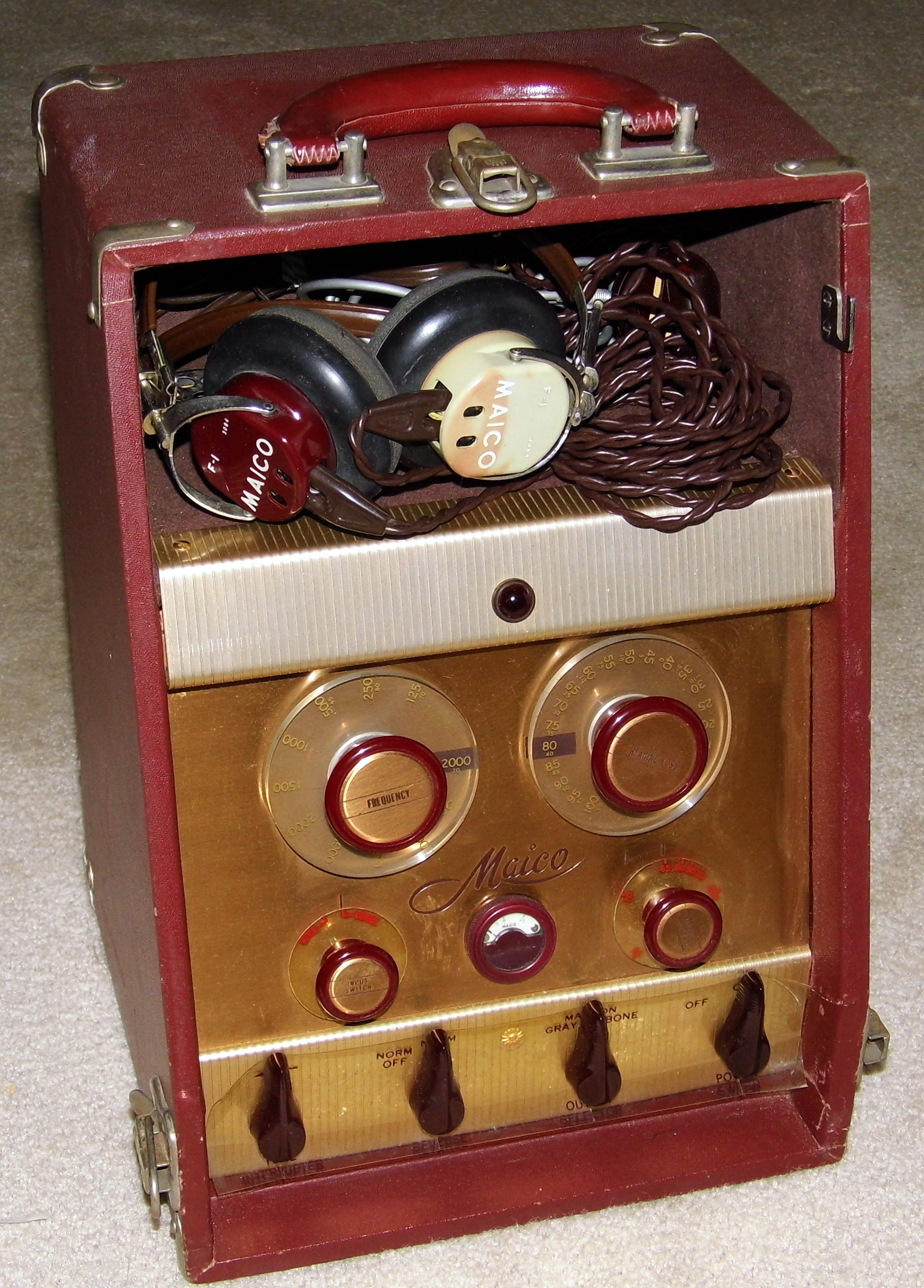
Portable audiometer Maico, circa 1960s

An audiometer typically transmits recorded sounds such as pure tones or speech to the headphones of the test subject at varying frequencies and intensities, and records the subject's responses to produce an audiogram of threshold sensitivity, or speech understanding profile.

== Types ==
Medical grade audiometers are usually an embedded hardware unit controlled from a PC. Software audiometers which run on a PC are also commercially available, but their accuracy and utility for evaluating hearing loss is questionable due to lack of a calibration standard.

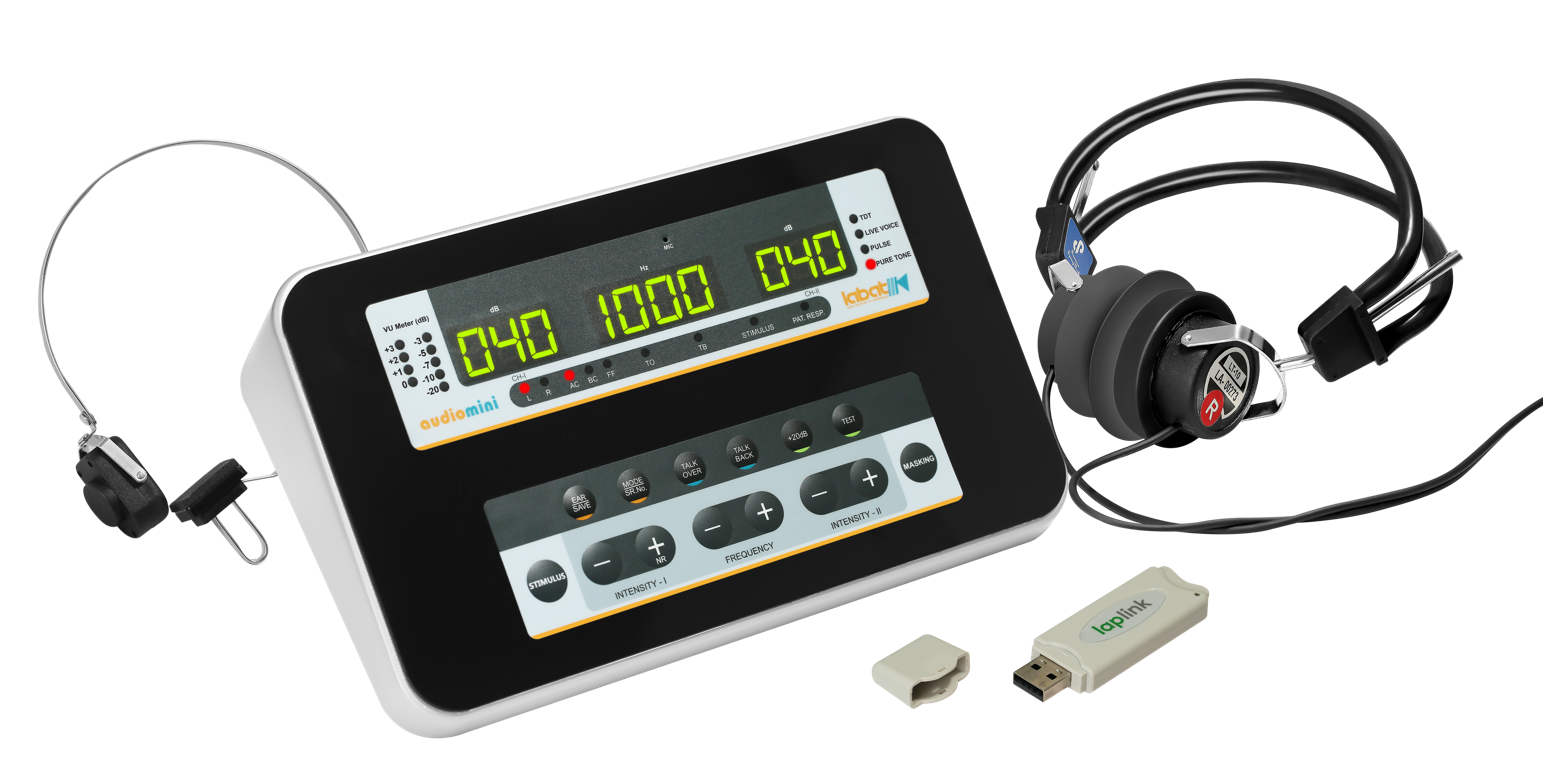
Wireless audiometer which works on mobile devices via wireless connectivity i.e. Bluetooth and Wifi

The most common type of audiometer generates pure tones, or transmits parts of speech. Another kind of audiometer is the Bekesy audiometer, in which the subject follows a tone of increasing and decreasing amplitude as the tone is swept through the frequency range by depressing a button when the tone is heard and releasing it when it cannot be heard, crossing back and forth over the threshold of hearing. Bekesy audiometry typically yields lower thresholds and standard deviations than pure tone audiometry.

== Standards ==
Audiometer requirements and the test procedure are specified in IEC 60645, ISO 8253, and ANSI isoS3.6 standards.

== See also ==
- Audiology
- Audiogram
- Audiometry
- Hearing test
- Pure tone audiometry
