= Auditory hypersensitivity =

General page for sound tolerance

Auditory hypersensitivity is a general term for heightened responses to some kinds of sounds, including responses of discomfort or distress. While most people can find certain sounds (such as squeaky chairs or "thumping" music from cars) annoying or uncomfortable, clinical levels of auditory hypersensitivity can involve unusually negative reactions to sounds that others would consider ordinary or tolerable. Auditory hypersensitivity can restrict people's ability to participate in everyday activities and is associated with poorer quality of life and mental health problems.

== Nomenclature ==
The terms auditory hypersensitivity or hypersensitivity to sounds are often used. However, the term "sensitivity" can also be used to describe low-level sensory perceptual functioning, especially the ability to detect or discriminate between sensory stimuli, such as that which might be affected in hearing loss. This is distinct from the heightened responses, mostly of distress and discomfort, that underpin the sort of auditory hypersensitivity discussed in this article; individuals with auditory hypersensitivity generally have an average ability to detect or discriminate sounds.

Other terms used to describe auditory hypersensitivity include decreased sound tolerance, sound tolerance conditions, sound intolerance, auditory hyperresponsiveness or hyperresponsivity, and auditory over-responsiveness or over-responsivity.

The term hyperacusis is sometimes used as a synonym for auditory hypersensitivity. However, it can be used more precisely to refer to a specific type of auditory hypersensitivity, as described below.

== Varieties ==
Some factor analyses and conceptual structures suggest that heightened responsiveness to sounds might be a single dimension along which people vary from experiencing lesser to greater responsiveness. However, these results come from studies of sensory processing patterns in general, and could reflect the large amount of variance explained by the inclusion of items from other modalities (e.g., visual perception) or patterns (e.g., hyposensitivity). Many other sources suggest distinct auditory hypersensitivity/sound tolerance conditions can be distinguished from one another. These include conditions like hyperacusis and misophonia, which can often co-occur or be associated with one another, although their symptoms are distinct, and separate mechanisms may be involved.

Reviews and summaries of auditory hypersensitivity and decreased sound tolerance also sometimes include exploding head syndrome, which refers to the perception of intense noises at the onset of sleep. However, auditory hypersensitivity and decreased sound tolerance refer to reactions to auditory stimuli, which thereby also excludes tinnitus, the perception of sounds such as ringing without an external source. Indeed, tinnitus is generally discussed as a condition that can frequently co-occur with auditory hypersensitivity rather than as a manifestation of auditory hypersensitivity or sound tolerance condition itself. Similarly, although the postulated condition of tonic tensor tympani syndrome has been suggested as a mechanism that may be involved in the auditory hypersensitivity conditions of hyperacusis and acoustic shock (as well as tinnitus), common symptoms associated with this putative syndrome include sensations of fullness in the ear, chronic pain in or around the ear, muffling or distortion of hearing (dysacusis), and rhythmic or fluttering aural sensations rather than sensitivity to external sounds per se.

=== Hyperacusis ===
Hyperacusis is a condition characterised by a reduced tolerance to sounds at levels/volumes that most people would consider normal and non-troubling. For people with hyperacusis, sounds at a volume that would not trouble most people can be uncomfortable, unpleasant, intense, frightening, painful, or overwhelming. For example, some people with hyperacusis can only tolerate sounds of volumes up to 60-70 dB, or the approximate volume of human conversation.

Hyperacusis is sometimes subdivided into the varieties of loudness hyperacusis and pain hyperacusis (also called noxacusis). Pain hyperacusis is characterised by a person experiencing physical pain in the ear in response to sounds that would not be loud enough to cause pain to most people (that is, less than about 120 dB). Loudness hyperacusis is characterised by an unusually low threshold for experiencing loudness discomfort, such as by finding sounds of moderate volume to be very loud.

There is some overlap between the symptoms of loudness hyperacusis and of sensory overload insofar as sensory overload includes negative reactions to the intensity of a sensory stimulus.

=== Loudness recruitment ===
Loudness recruitment is characterised by experiencing unusually swift increases in the perceived loudness of sounds relative to the sound's actual volume. As a result, people with loudness recruitment begin to find sounds uncomfortably loud at lower volumes than people in the general population. Loudness recruitment is believed to arise as a consequence of poorer hearing acuity, potentially due to damage to the outer hair cells of the cochlea.

Importantly, although the two have sometimes been confused, loudness recruitment is not the same phenomenon as loudness hyperacusis. At particularly high sound intensities/volumes, perceived loudness for listeners with normal hearing eventually catches up to and matches perceived loudness for people with loudness recruitment, whereas people with loudness hyperacusis continue to experience unusually strong discomfort to sounds even when most people would find them quite loud.

=== Misophonia ===
Misophonia is characterised by an abnormally strong emotional or physiological reaction to specific, everyday sounds (referred to as "triggers") which are not loud or even noticed by others, as well as other sensory stimuli associated with those sounds. Reactions to trigger sounds can include frustration, anxiety, anger, a need to leave or stop the sound, disgust, as well as physiological arousal. Triggers are often repetitive oral or nasal sounds like chewing, swallowing, slurping, throat clearing, or sniffling, but other sounds like repetitive pen clicks, clock ticking, footsteps, and typing are also common misophonia triggers.

In contrast to hyperacusis and loudness recruitment, misophonic responses are not caused by a sound's loudness, but by the pattern of the sound or even what the sound means to a person. Misophonia is also considered to be distinct from the annoyance caused by ambient environmental sounds, such as background chatter. Negative reactions to being surrounded by many sensory stimuli at once might fall within the concept of sensory overload and overwhelm, rather than misophonia.

=== Phonophobia ===
Phonophobia is a specific phobia of particular sounds or classes of sounds. While most people could fear certain loud or threatening sounds, phonophobia refers explicitly to disproportionate and irrational fears of sounds.

Unlike other decreased sound tolerance or auditory hypersensitivity conditions described here, phonophobia does not directly involve discomfort caused by sounds. It can arise as a consequence of other forms of auditory hypersensitivity, but for someone with another auditory hypersensitivity condition like hyperacusis or misophonia to also have phonophobia, their level of phonophobic fear, anxiety, and avoidance would need to exceed what could be expected from the discomfort or pain caused by their other auditory hypersensitivity conditions.

=== Noise sensitivity ===
Noise sensitivity refers to individual differences in how much annoyance people experience due to ambient and background noise, such as traffic. There is little relationship between noise sensitivity and noise exposure.

In contrast to auditory hypersensitivity conditions like hyperacusis and misophonia, noise sensitivity is conceptualised as a personality trait. How noise sensitivity relates to auditory hypersensitivity conditions is poorly researched. Individuals with hyperacusis report high levels of noise sensitivity. However, in contrast to hyperacusis, noise sensitivity in the general population does not necessarily substantially change the steepness of the relationship between sounds' actual volume and perceived loudness.

=== Auditory distractibility ===
Distraction caused by background noise can have considerable effects on cognitive performance, although the precise ways in which irrelevant sounds affect performance may differ somewhat across tasks and populations. So far, limited research has attempted to bridge gaps between studying auditory distractibility in controlled laboratory environments and everyday, real-world environments, but performance on experimental measures of auditory attentional capture can be related to one's self-reported propensity towards experiencing distractibility and inattention in general.

Some studies suggest that sound intolerance and distraction caused by sounds could be related but distinct phenomena. For example, in the general population, how much sounds in workplaces are distracting and affect workplace job performance seems to constitute a somewhat different dimension from the annoyance caused by the sounds. How much hearing irrelevant speech interferes with one's task performance is only weakly related to self-reported noise sensitivity. Similarly, an autism study suggests that how much one's attention tends to be captured by distracting auditory stimuli in one's environment appears to be somewhat distinguishable from one's propensity towards experiencing noise distress.

=== Acoustic shock ===
Acoustic shock refers to putative injuries that are believed to be caused by brief, unexpected, loud sounds, such as feedback in headsets in telephone call centres. There has been controversy over the validity of the condition and whether it is indeed auditory or psychogenic.

Acoustic shock is sometimes described as a type of auditory hypersensitivity, but other sources do not list it as a sound tolerance condition or form of auditory hypersensitivity. Its symptoms can include hyperacusis and noise sensitivity, but the most common symptoms may be chronic pain and tinnitus even when no sound is present. Auditory hypersensitivity and sound tolerance conditions are often understood to refer directly to reactions to auditory stimulation.

=== Superior canal dehiscence syndrome ===
Superior canal dehiscence syndrome arises when the temporal bone is thin or absent, creating an opening into the superior semicircular canal. One of the most common symptoms of this syndrome is a form of hyperacusis sometimes referred to as bone hyperacusis or bone conduction hyperacusis.

In contrast to conventional loudness and pain hyperacusis, bone hyperacusis increases the loudness of bodily sounds such as one's own voice, footsteps, or even eye movements, by enhancing their transmission through bone conduction. Superior canal dehiscence can actually reduce one's ability to hear external, air-conducted sounds, since air pressure can exit the superior semicircular canal at the opening.

== History ==
The phenomenon of loudness recruitment was first described in the 1920s, providing an early mechanism for auditory hypersensitivity.

The concept of hyperacusis was another early auditory hypersensitivity term to enter the research literature, with the term being first used in 1938 by Perlman. However, Perlman's use of the term differs from contemporary conceptualisations of hyperacusis as a condition; Perlman used the term as part of an already-established auditory hypersensitivity literature dating back to the nineteenth century regarding the consequences of losing the stapedial reflex, such as in facial paralysis. Research also suggested that auditory hypersensitivity and sound intolerance could arise from stapedectomy surgery or from Ménière's disease. In the 1990s, these types of auditory hypersensitivity were termed peripheral hyperacusis to distinguish them from central hyperacusis, a term reflecting a belief that when these peripheral causes could be excluded, hyperacusis presumably reflected mechanisms in the central nervous system.

This assumption that cases of hyperacusis otherwise had central origins ran somewhat contrary to theories about tonic tensor tympani syndrome, an idea which was developed beginning in the 1970s. According to this idea, fluctuations of the tensor tympani muscle in the middle ear could also be involved in hyperacusis. This hypothesis remained largely speculative until 2022, when air pressure measurements and tympanometry suggested the tensor tympani muscle can by hyper-reactive in some people with tonic tensor tympani syndrome symptoms, although tonic contraction itself was not observed.

The distinction between central and peripheral origins of hyperacusis was also expanded through the addition of another term, bone hyperacusis, involving enhanced bone conduction of internal/bodily sounds. This idea emerged in the years following the description of superior canal dehiscence syndrome in 1998.

Meanwhile, the term phonophobia had been introduced in 1949, initially as an alternative synonym for hyperacusis, due to concern that the term hyperacusis might imply the presence of increased hearing acuity. Thus, the terms hyperacusis and phonophobia were long considered synonymous, especially in migraine research. Over the second half of the twentieth century, the term phonophobia was widely used to refer to discomfort and pain during migraines and headaches.

Another distinct research tradition has focused on noise sensitivity, individual differences in the level of annoyance caused by background noise such as traffic. This noise sensitivity research tradition developed largely following the publication of a 1963 report on noise annoyance related to London's Heathrow Airport.

By the 1990s, scientific research increasingly described hyperacusis as a specific condition involving discomfort and pain to sounds that most others would not consider loud, generally in the absence of differences in auditory sensory acuity or damage to acoustic reflexes, which is consistent with contemporary definitions. In 1991, an early self-help organisation called the Hyperacusis Network was established for people experiencing hyperacusis and auditory hypersensitivity, which helped to foster dialogue between patient and clinical communities. By the early 2000s, first-person narratives of hyperacusis and options for therapy began for the first time to receive substantial attention.

The term selective sound sensitivity syndrome was first introduced by Marsha Johnson in 1997 to describe the emotional reactions to specific sounds that Margaret and Pawel Jastreboff soon afterwards referred to as misophonia in 2001. The Jastreboffs made clear that this sort of misophonia was a distinct condition from hyperacusis. Online communities and advocacy and support groups, such as soQuiet, have played a key role in advancing the concept of misophonia. Although misophonia is not currently a recognised condition in major clinical diagnostic classification systems, a consensus definition of misophonia was published in 2022.

Furthermore, in 2001, Margaret and Pawel Jastreboff described another condition, phonophobia, involving irrational fears of sounds, which they conceptualised as a specific type of misophonia. This shifted the meaning of the term phonophobia away from being synonymous with hyperacusis. Subsequently, other researchers have generally regarded phonophobia and misophonia as also being distinct and separate conditions from each other.

At around the same time, in 1999-2001, acoustic shock injuries following brief, unexpected, loud sounds were being described, initially in workers in telephone call centres. The reported condition led workers to make compensation claims, and controversy erupted over whether the phenomenon of acoustic shock reflected a genuinely auditory injury or was primarily psychogenic. More recent sources suggest the condition has become more recognised, although its mechanisms and prevalence continue to be debated.

=== Frameworks not specific to sounds ===
These auditory-specific approaches to auditory hypersensitivity have been complemented by research on sensory hypersensitivity, hyperresponsiveness, and overwhelm across modalities; that is, they include hearing, but are not specific to it. Analogously to the distinction between auditory research focused on noise sensitivity and research focused on clinical decreased sound tolerance conditions such as hyperacusis and misophonia, sensory processing research across modalities includes several distinct research traditions.

One tradition focuses on sensory processing sensitivity, which is conceptualised as a form of personality variation. This area of research is closely associated with the work of Elaine and Arthur Aron, who published the Highly Sensitive Person Scale in 1997.

This can be distinguished from another area of research that investigates sensory processing differences in both the general population and people who experience distressing or impairing sensory differences. This area began with Jean Ayres' work on sensory integration and modulation in the 1960s and 1970s, which led to the controversial practice of sensory integration therapy. This sensory literature, however, remained relatively unfocused on sound tolerance; for example, when the Sensory Profile was developed in the 1990s, auditory items did not load on the sensory sensitivity factor. However, more recent tools such as the Glasgow Sensory Questionnaire, Sensory Sensitivity Scales, or newer versions of the Sensory Experiences Questionnaire have included auditory items in factors measuring general sensory sensitivity or hyperresponsiveness.

A third distinct, modality-independent idea that intersects with auditory hypersensitivity appears to come from the concepts of sensory overload and overwhelm. These concepts refer to when the intensity, diversity, or pattern of environmental stimuli are experienced as aversive, whether or not the stimuli are auditory.

== See also ==
- Auditory processing disorder - difficulties processing and interpreting sounds, such as speech in noise
- Exploding head syndrome - perceiving brief, loud sounds when falling asleep or waking up
- Hearing loss - partial or total inability to hear
- Misophonia - intense emotional or physical reaction to certain sounds
- Sensory processing sensitivity - increased susceptibility to sensory overstimulation
- Sensory processing disorder - a condition in which multisensory input is not adequately processed for appropriate responses to the demands of the environment
- Sensory overload - experiencing overwhelm from sensory stimulation in one's environment
- Tinnitus - perception of sounds, especially ringing, with no external source
- Tonic tensor tympani syndrome - debated condition involving middle ear muscles, although evidence of tonic contraction in individuals experiencing sound intolerance has not been found
