= Duearity =

Swedish medical products company

Duearity AB
- Formerly: Cochlearity
- Type: Public (Aktiebolag)
- Industry: Medical equipment · Tinnitus treatment
- Defunct: September 10, 2024
- Headquarters: Malmö, Sweden
- Key people: Peter Arndt (Chairman); Fredrik Westman (CEO); Gunnar Telhammar (CFO)
- Products: Tinearity G1; Tinearity AI
- Website: www.duearity.com

Duearity was a Swedish medical technology company based in Malmö. The company specialised in hardware and software for tinnitus treatment. From May 2021 to September 2024, Duearity was publicly traded on the Nasdaq First North stock exchange.

== Origins ==
Peter Arndt, one of Duearity's founders, was undergoing tinnitus retraining therapy (TRT) and noticed the treatment to be effective, but incompatible with daily life. Tinnitus retraining therapy is based on cognitive behavioral therapy and requires white noise to be played uninterrupted for 6-8 hours per day for 6-24 months. Wearing headphones for prolonged and uninterrupted period of time was interfering with work during daytime and with sleep during nighttime.

The founders set out to find a solution that did not require headphones and did not occupy the ear canals. In 2020, a proof of concept was successfully completed and the company applied for a patent.

== IPO ==
On 11 May 2021, the company's shares debuted on Nasdaq First North under ticker symbol DEAR. The company was previously called Cochlearity, but the name was changed pre-IPO in order to avoid mixup with another medtech company.

75,3% of the IPO shares were subscribed before the IPO offer was made public. Duearity’s IPO was oversubscribed by 9 times.

== Products and market ==
Duearity is focusing its products on white noise and tinnitus retraining therapy, which has been shown to be effective in a variety of research studies.

Since 2020, Duearity has been developing the world's smallest and most flexible tinnitus aid that emits white noise through bone conduction technology. It is a patented medtech CE class IIa product with FDA 510(k) clearance in the U.S. It is a non-invasive device that attaches behind the ears and keeps the ear canals free.

Duearity is also developing a software for analysing tinnitus and managing its symptoms. The company observes strong interest from researchers, audiologists and otorhinolaryngologists.

== See also ==
- Zwicker tone
- Tinnitus
- Hearing aid
- Tinnitus masker
- List of people with tinnitus
