= Dear =

Dear(s) or The Dears may refer to:

== Manga ==
- Dear (manga), a 2002–2007 Japanese manga series by Cocoa Fujiwara
- DearS, a 2002–2005 Japanese manga series by Peach-Pit, and a 2004 anime series and visual novel
- Dear+, a Japanese manga magazine

== Music ==
- Dears (band), a Taiwanese duo
- The Dears, a Canadian rock band
- Dear (Apink album) or the title song, "Dear (Whisper)", 2016
- Dear (Boris album) or the title song, 2017
- Dear (Hey! Say! JUMP album) or the title song, 2016
- Dear (Shion Miyawaki album), 2008
- "Dear" (Mika Nakashima song), 2011
- "Dear" (Vivid song), 2009
- Dear., a 2018 EP by Cavetown

== Other uses ==
- Dear (film)
- Dear (surname)
- Dear White People
- Dear White People (TV series)
- Duearity, a Swedish medtech company which trades on Nasdaq First North under ticker symbol DEAR
- Drop Everything And Read, a school-based sustained silent reading program

== See also ==
- Dear... (disambiguation)
- Dear Dear, a 1992 album by 54-40
- Deer (disambiguation)
- Salutation
- Term of endearment
