= Phonophobia =

Fear of specific sounds

- Other names: Ligyrophobia, sonophobia, acousticophobia, fear hyperacusis
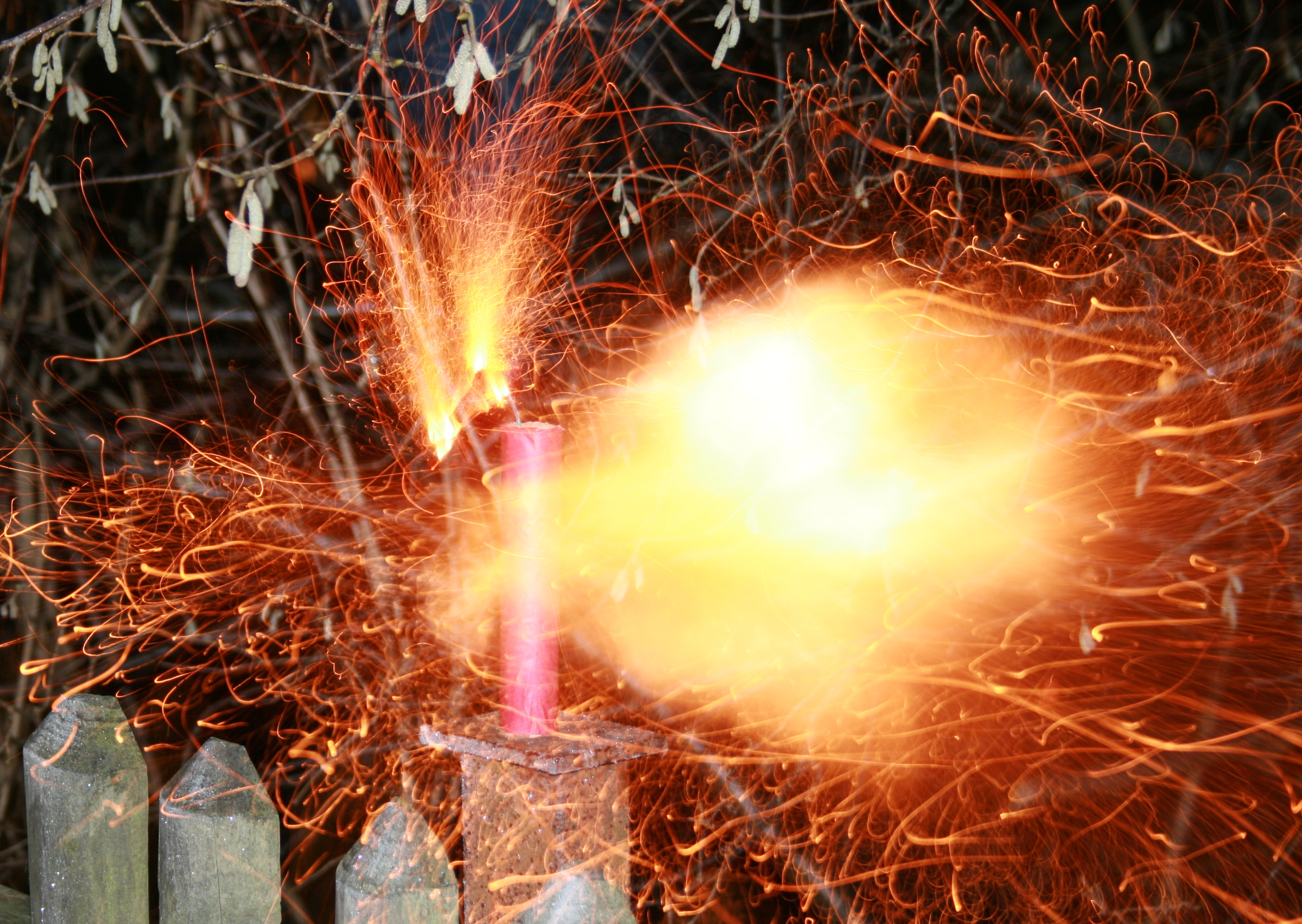
- A firecracker exploding; sudden loud noises are common triggers.
- Pronunciation: /ˌfoʊnəˈfoʊbiə/
- Specialty: Psychiatry, neurology
- Symptoms: Anxiety, panic attack, avoidance behavior
- Diagnostic method: Clinical evaluation
- Differential diagnosis: Hyperacusis, misophonia, migraine
- Treatment: Counselling, exposure therapy

Phonophobia, also called ligyrophobia or sonophobia, is a fear of or aversion to specific sounds—a type of specific phobia as well as a form of auditory hypersensitivity. Occasionally it is called acousticophobia. Although some sounds could be feared by most people, such as certain loud sounds or sounds that signal threats, fears of these sounds would not be considered phonophobia unless the amount of fear and anxiety was disproportionate. In phonophobia, the feared sounds may be ones that are soft and non-damaging, such as kitchen sounds or a door closing. Another example is watching someone blow up a balloon beyond its normal capacity. This is often an unsettling, even disturbing thing for a person with phonophobia to observe, as they anticipate a loud sound when the balloon pops.

Phonophobia generally leads to anxiety around and avoidance of contexts where individuals might be exposed to feared sounds. Such avoidance could risk making the auditory system more sensitive.

== Co-occurring conditions and differential diagnosis ==
Although phonophobia can arise as a secondary consequence of other sound tolerance conditions, this does not make it synonymous with them. As phonophobia refers specifically to irrational fears of sounds, not rational ones, phonophobic fear, anxiety, and avoidance would need to exceed the level expected due to the discomfort or pain caused by any other sound tolerance conditions.

One other sound tolerance condition that can sometimes be observed alongside phonophobia is hyperacusis, or discomfort or even pain caused by sounds that most people would not consider uncomfortably loud. Indeed, phonophobia is sometimes referred to as a specific type of hyperacusis, fear hyperacusis, although other authors regard hyperacusis and phonophobia as distinct conditions, insofar as hyperacusis involves discomfort caused by a physical sound whereas phonophobia does not.

Another type of sound intolerance that can co-occur with phonophobia is misophonia, or emotional reactions to specific trigger sounds that need not be loud (e.g., anger in response to chewing sounds). Indeed, phonophobia has even been conceptualised as a type of misophonia. However, other sources regard the specific phobia and anticipatory fears and avoidance of phonophobia as being distinct from the emotional reactions characteristic of misophonia.

Moreover, phonophobia may co-occur with tinnitus (perception of sounds, especially ringing sounds, without an external source) or with generic noise sensitivity (sensory processing sensitivity towards sounds).

== Management ==
To ensure that treatments and supports are directed appropriately, it is important to distinguish phonophobic fears from other sound tolerance conditions. For example, exposure therapies are commonly used to treat specific phobias, but could be considered to involve unacceptable risk if a patient were at significantly elevated likelihood of experiencing harm compared to other people who can engage in a given activity without incident. As such, while there are specialised therapies for sound tolerance conditions like misophonia and hyperacusis that can involve exposure, exposing people to sounds that cause them discomfort or pain could be harmful, suggesting that exposure therapy – or at least more conventional forms of exposure therapy – may be more appropriate for pure phonophobia without other sound tolerance conditions. Providing information and counselling regarding the benign nature of sounds eliciting phonophobic reactions is also recommended as a phonophobia treatment.

== Terminology and origins of the concept ==
The term phonophobia comes from Greek φωνή - phōnē, "voice" or "sound" and φόβος - phobos, "fear".

When the word phonophobia was first introduced in 1949, it was as a synonym for hyperacusis, due to concern that the term hyperacusis might imply the presence of increased hearing acuity. As a result, the word phonophobia has been used in neurology to refer to sound intolerance observed in people who experience migraine headaches, especially during migraines, which is very distinct from the modern understanding of phonophobia. The presence of such sound intolerance may be used to support the diagnosis of migraine. Definitions and measures of the sound intolerance that can accompany migraines emphasise that it involves feelings of discomfort and auditory pain, implying that the type of sound intolerance described would indeed be hyperacusis and not phonophobia.

The contemporary concept of phonophobia was introduced by Margaret and Pawel Jastreboff in 2001. They viewed phonophobia as a type of misophonia, emotional reactions to specific sounds. Subsequently, phonophobia has generally been recognised as a distinct and separate condition from misophonia.

== See also ==
- Astraphobia – fear of thunder
- Auditory hypersensitivity – hypersensitivity to sounds and sound intolerance in general, including but not limited to phonophobia
- Globophobia – the fear of balloons, which is commonly linked to phonophobia
- List of phobias
- Misophonia – excessive or irrational negative emotional reactions, such as anger or disgust, to specific sounds
- Hyperacusis – aversions to loud sounds
- Sensory processing sensitivity – increased susceptibility to sensory overstimulation
- Sensory overload – experiencing overwhelm from sensory stimulation in one's environment
