= Tonic tensor tympani syndrome =

- Other names: TTTS

Tonic tensor tympani syndrome is a hypothesized syndrome of the tensor tympani muscle. The tensor tympani muscle is one of the two middle ear muscles that support the three middle ear bones, called the ossicles. TTTS involves tensor tympani muscle activity being reduced, leading to a decrease in the contraction threshold of the tensor tympani which is exaggerated by high stress levels. This hyper-contraction (or spasms) leads to chronic ear pain, in particular in the case of hyperacusis and acoustic shock. TTTS is considered to be a secondary consequence of temporomandibular disorder and temporomandibular joint dysfunction. TTTS is commonly confused with middle ear myoclonus.

== Controversy ==
Tonic Tensor Tympani Syndrome's existence has been debated by professionals. It is currently a hypothesis for where these symptoms come from rather than a recognized medical condition. The studies supporting the hypothesis are limited, outdated, and inconsistent. Researchers are still debating the cluster of symptoms and existence of the syndrome. Recent publications suggest abolishing the term TTTS.

== Signs and symptoms ==
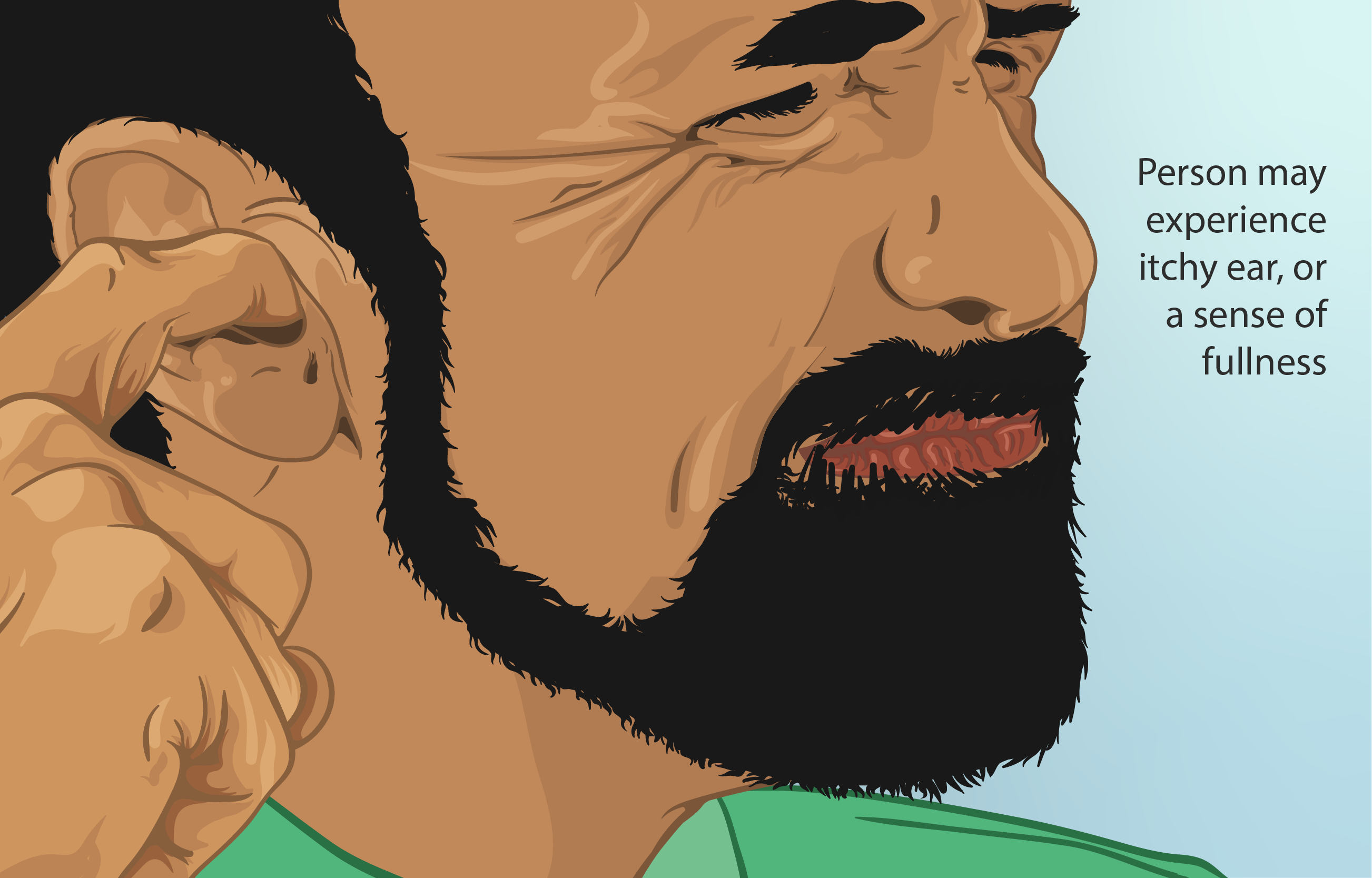
Ear pain

TTTS can present as a variety of symptoms, including sensation of fullness in the ear, tinnitus, rhythmic sounds such as clicks and flutter of the tympanic membrane, ear fullness, a frequent "popping" sensation, hyperacusis, and mild vertigo. These symptoms tend to last for a short period of time. Long-term symptoms include muffled and distorted hearing, ear pain, ear numbness, and burning sensations in and around the ear down to the neck. Burning sensations can extend to the cheek and jaw area. In many people with tinnitus and almost all people with significant hyperacusis, an involuntary hyperactivity or myoclonus (spasm) appears to develop in the tensor tympani muscle as an involuntary 'protective' response to sounds (or other stimuli) subconsciously evaluated as potentially painful.

== Cause ==
TTTS can occur involuntarily following exposure to an acoustic incident, which is exposure to a sudden and unexpected loud sound that is perceived as threatening. However, TTTS can also occur following simple actions that include the middle ear muscles like talking, chewing, swallowing, or even being startled. Eustachian Tube Dysfunction, which is common amongst those with a history of chronic ear infections, sinus infections, or seasonal allergies can also initiate TTTS due to the disruption of the function of the middle ear system. TTTS symptoms have also been reported in patients with trigeminal nerve irritability or trigeminal neuralgia, which are conditions that affect the nerves of the auditory system.

== Pathophysiology ==
Inner Ear Anatomy

The tensor tympani muscle is located in the middle ear, and is one of the two middle ear muscles that support the three middle ear bones, the ossicles. The tensor tympani is attached to the malleus, the largest of ossicles. One end of malleus is connected to the tympanic membrane, and the other end is connected to the two other ossicles, the incus and stapes, which connects to the inner ear. The purpose of the middle ear is to deliver the sound waves from the outer ear to the cochlea of the inner ear. When external sound contacts the eardrum, the ossicles vibrate. This vibration can be amplified depending on the volume of the sound.

The tensor tympani is meant to pull the tympanic membrane inward, increasing tension of the tympanic membrane. It's like a calming mechanism that's in place in order to stabilize volume and respond to noise fluctuations, that also provides inner ear protection from loud sounds. It also helps ventilate the inner ear through the Eustachian Tube. When TTTS occurs, the middle ear is contracting involuntarily, which produces an audible sensation called the middle ear myoclonus. When the tensor tympani muscle experiences a spasm without the provocation of loud sounds, it's called the acoustic reflex, which is part of a normal auditory system. However, this reaction can be caused by general anxiety, or anxiety concerning the sudden onset of noises or ear pain, which can follow an acoustic incident.

== Diagnosis ==

An otolaryngologist, or ENT, is a healthcare specialist who is able to diagnose TTTS. A challenge in obtaining a diagnosis is that there is not yet any definitive guideline to assess for the disorder. However, an impedance angiogram can be helpful while diagnosing TTTS by assessing the status of the middle ear. Other diagnostic tools like MRI and CT can be helpful in ruling out other potential causes of TTTS symptoms. A tympanometry is a diagnostic tool that is able to assess the pressure of the middle ear, but if the tensor tympani is not actively contracting, tympanometry will likely not observe it. TTTS can be commonly mistaken for temporomandibular joint disorders.

== Treatment / management ==
Management of patients with TTTS varies depending on the severity of symptoms and expectations.

=== Surgical procedures ===
The most common procedure for tonic tensor tympani syndrome is tympanotomy with tensor tympani tenotomy. This is a relatively simple surgical procedure that involves endoscopically cutting the tensor tympani muscle to eliminate spasms. A tensor tympani tenotomy is the preferred method of treatment due to being a safe and reliable procedure with high success rates, providing longterm relief from middle ear spasms.

=== Medications ===
Medications like benzodiazepines, botulinum toxin, and carbamazepine have been used for treatment of TTTS with variable efficacy. Benzodiazepines target the anxiolytic component of the disorder and acts as a muscle relaxant, potentially decreasing symptoms. Botulinum toxin prevents the release of acetylcholine from pre-synaptic neurons and is well-documented in the use of non-cosmetic otolaryngology-associated disease processes like hemi-facial spasms. However, researchers are still examining the efficacy of botulinum toxin for TTTS.

=== Holistic approach ===
Holistic treatment options include relaxation techniques, sound, and tinnitus retraining therapies. Methods of relaxation are frequently included in comprehensive treatment plans with TTTS, and can aid in changing the way the brain reacts to the pain of a TTTS episode. Sound therapy can help with symptom desensitization, which can help reduce the ear pain and discomfort associated with TTTS, and improve anxiety levels. Some patients have also seen relief with botox injections to help reduce tonic tensor tympani spasms. Holistic approaches are typically least desired by patients with TTTS due lack of definitive success rates and varying results.

== Epidemiology ==
Gender disparities for TTTS are not apparent, a multi-clinic study stated that its patients were 51.9% male and 48.1% female. When the disorder is not the result of an acoustic incident, it can more commonly occur in the third decade of life. No other demographic disparities have been observed in TTTS. The number of how many people affected by TTTS hasn't yet been documented.

== Prognosis ==
TTTS is not necessarily life-threatening in any way. The symptoms are unpleasant, but TTTS is not a harmful disorder when it exists alone. TTTS can be mentally debilitating, causing a high amount of distress in those who suffer from it, reducing quality of life. Tonic tensor tympani syndrome can occur at any age, with the chances of occurrence raise drastically if an acoustic incident takes place.

=== Medical journals and case studies ===
In a multi-clinic prevalence study, the prevalence of co-existing disorders and an acoustic incident trigger for TTTS were both studied. It was shown that 42.3% of patients had hyperacusis in addition to TTTS, and 24.1% of patients reported having initially developed TTTS following an acoustic incident trigger.

== See also ==
Middle Ear Myoclonus
