= Middle ear myoclonus =

Spasms of the middle ear muscles

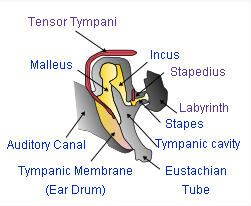
- Specialty: Otolaryngology, neurotology
- Symptoms: Objective tinnitus
- Types: Stapedial myoclonus, tensor tympani myoclonus
- Medication: Carbamazepine, baclofen, clonazepam

Middle ear myoclonus (MEM) is a rare disorder involving involuntary muscle contractions of the middle ear muscles, specifically the tensor tympani and stapedius. The symptoms are characterized by objective tinnitus and a subjective sensation of middle ear muscle contractions. The etiology of MEM is often idiopathic and diagnosis is challenging. Management options can range from conservative pharmacotherapy to surgical intervention.

== Signs and symptoms ==
The most prominent symptom of middle ear myoclonus is objective tinnitus in the form of noises experienced in the ear. Their characteristics depend on the involved muscles. Patients typically describe the perceived noises as fluttering, thumping, crackling, clicking, buzzing, or similar sounds. A sensation of muscle contractions may also be present. The myoclonus can be triggered spontaneously or in response to sound stimuli. Once triggered the myoclonus can last for several hours.

== Causes ==
Involuntary spasms of the Tensor Tympani or the Stapedius muscle can cause movement to the ossicles, the eardrum or the Eustachian tube opening, which can lead to physical sensations and various kinds of sounds experienced by the patient.

The underlying neurological reason causing the muscles to move can be hard to determine as various neurological disorders either in the brain or involving the innervating nerves can cause the myoclonus. Compression of the innervating nerves can lead to demyelination of the nerve, leading to erratic and hyperactive functioning resulting in involuntary muscle spasms. Brain lesions, tumors or degenerative neurological diseases such as Multiple Sclerosis can also lead to middle ear myoclonus.

== Diagnosis ==
Diagnosing MEM is challenging and relies heavily on clinical patient history and symptoms. Diagnosis may be supported by observation of to-and-fro eardrum movement during muscle contractions using endoscopic or otoscopic examination. The muscle contractions may also be observed with tympanometry or acoustic reflex decay testing. Hypertrophy of the muscles may be detectable when analyzed with temporal bone CT scans.

An MRI can be used to detect possible anomalies in the brain or to check whether a compression of the nerves inervating the middle ear muscles (CN V and CN VII) is present.

=== Differential diagnosis ===
The differential diagnosis for MEM includes palatal myoclonus, pulsatile tinnitus, and subjective tinnitus. Palatal myoclonus is a condition which includes similar symptoms of objective clicking noises. It involves a different set of muscles within the soft palate, specifically the Tensor veli palatini or the Levator veli palatini. Pulsatile tinnitus produces a rhythmic whooshing or thumping sound that matches the heartbeat. It is typically vascular in nature and unrelated to MEM.

== Management ==
=== Medication ===
Anticonvulsants such as carbamazepine have been reported to reduce or resolve the symptoms of middle ear myoclonus. Other medications tested for treatment are muscle relaxants such as baclofen or benzodiazepines such as clonazepam.

=== Botulinum toxin ===
Intratympanic botulinum toxin injections into the middle ear cavity have been reported as an effective treatment option for middle ear myoclonus. Approximately 40% of patients have been reported to experience complete resolution and 51% partial resolution, with improvements lasting up to six months. The safety profile of the procedure has not been established.

Injecting botulinum toxin directly into the middle ear muscles is an alternative option for treating MEM. This involves a transcanal surgical approach, which may require general anesthesia. This method is more invasive but allows the toxin to be directly injected into the muscles.

=== Surgery ===
In refractory cases of middle ear myoclonus, a surgical tenotomy may be considered. This involves sectioning the tensor tympani and stapedius tendons. The procedure is effective, with approximately 85% of patients experiencing full resolution of symptoms. However, incomplete sectioning or misdiagnosis of the condition can result in failure. There have been reports of the tendons reattaching through scar tissue after the operation, requiring a revision of the procedure. This may be avoided by resecting a portion of the tendons rather than simply sectioning them. Both tendons are often sectioned, as it is difficult to determine the offending muscle. The procedure can be completed using a minimally invasive transcanal approach.

Risks of the procedure include those common to middle ear surgery. A unique side effect of the surgery is loudness hyperacusis, which sometimes develops as a result of sectioning the stapedius tendon due to its involvement in the acoustic reflex. This side effect rarely affects quality of life severely, but in cases where it does, the tendons may be artificially reattached with a separate operation.

== Epidemiology ==
The prevalence of middle ear myoclonus is unknown due to its rarity and frequent misdiagnosis. Some clinical research suggests MEM may account for 1.5% of people who experience objective tinnitus. There are no significant differences among men and women in the incidence of MEM. MEM may be most common in individuals aged 20-29.
