= Dear... =

Dear… may refer to:

- Dear... (Kyoko Fukada album)
- Dear... (The Grace album)
- Dear... (Sachi Tainaka album)
- "Dear..." (song), a 2007 song by May J
- Dear... (TV series), a 2020 television series on Apple TV+

== See also ==
- Dear (disambiguation)
