= Nerve to the stapedius =

Nerve of the middle ear

Details
- From: Facial nerve
- Innervates: Stapedius

Identifiers
- Latin: nervus stapedius
- TA98: A14.2.01.101
- TA2: 6291
- FMA: 53275

The nerve to the stapedius is a branch of the facial nerve (CN VII) which innervates the stapedius muscle. It arises from the CN VII within the facial canal, opposite the pyramidal eminence. It passes through a small canal in this eminence to reach the stapedius muscle.
