= Pyramidal eminence =

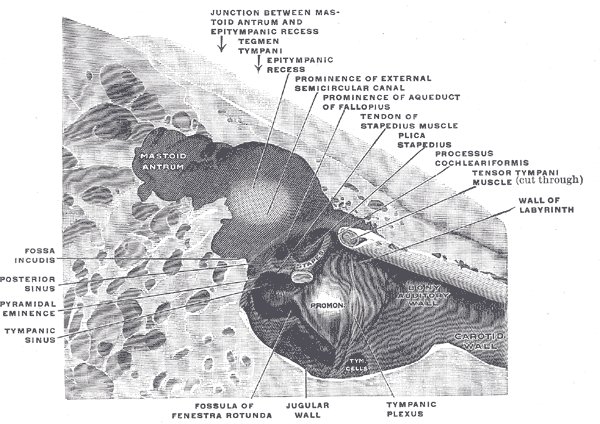
- The medial wall and part of the posterior and anterior walls of the right tympanic cavity, lateral view. (Pyramidal eminence labeled at left, second from bottom.)

Details

Identifiers
- Latin: eminentia pyramidalis
- TA98: A15.3.02.024
- TA2: 6913
- FMA: 77732

The pyramidal eminence is a hollow conical projection upon the posterior wall of the tympanic cavity of the middle ear. The stapedius muscle arises in the hollow of the eminence and its tendon exits through its apex.

The pyramidal eminence is situated inferior to the aditus to mastoid antrum, immediately inferior to the oval window (fenestra vestibuli), and anterior to the vertical portion of the facial canal. The apex of the eminence is directed anteriorly toward the oval window.

The cavity in the pyramidal eminence is prolonged inferoposteriorly anterior to the facial canal, with which it communicates by a minute aperture which transmits the nerve to the stapedius from the facial nerve (CN VII).

The space lateral to the pyramidal eminence is the facial recess, which is accessed during surgery for cochlear implant. The space medial to the pyramidal eminence is the sinus tympani.
