= Tensor tympani muscle =

Muscle of the middle ear

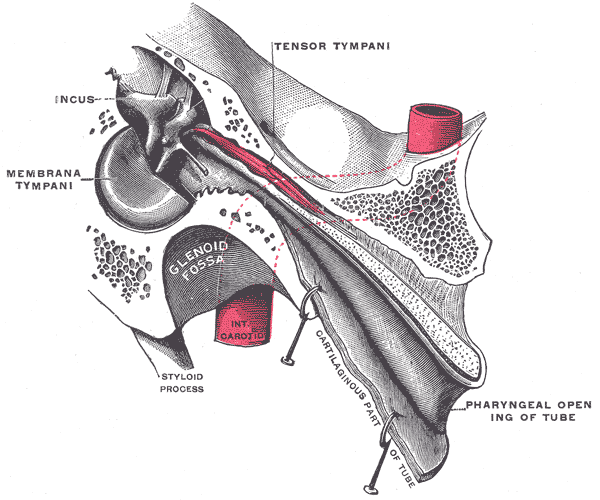

Details
- Origin: Auditory tube
- Insertion: Handle of the malleus
- Artery: Superior tympanic artery
- Nerve: Medial pterygoid nerve from the mandibular nerve (V_{3})
- Actions: Tensing the tympanic membrane

Identifiers
- Latin: musculus tensor tympani
- MeSH: D013719
- TA98: A15.3.02.061
- TA2: 2102
- FMA: 49028

The tensor tympani is a skeletal muscle within the middle ear, located in the bony canal above the bony part of the auditory tube, and connects to the malleus bone. Its role is to dampen loud sounds, such as those produced from chewing, shouting, or thunder. Because its reaction time is not fast enough, the muscle cannot protect against hearing damage caused by sudden loud sounds, like explosions or gunshots, however some individuals have voluntary control over the muscle, and may tense it pre-emptively.

== Structure ==
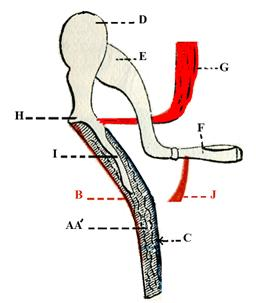
Insertion of the tensor tympani muscle onto the malleus. . AA’ (two fibrous collagenic layers); B epidermis; C mucous membrane; D head of malleus; E incus; F stapes; G tensor tympani; H lateral process of malleus; I Manubrium of malleus; J stapedius muscle.

The tensor tympani is a muscle that is present in the middle ear. It arises from the cartilaginous part of the auditory tube, and the adjacent great wing of the sphenoid. It then passes through its own canal, and ends in the tympanic cavity as a slim tendon that connects to the handle of the malleus. The tendon makes a sharp bend around the processus cochleariformis, part of the wall of its cavity, before it joins with the malleus.

The tensor tympani receives blood from the middle meningeal artery via the superior tympanic branch. It is one of two muscles in the tympanic cavity, the other being the stapedius.

=== Nerve supply ===
The tensor tympani is supplied by the tensor tympani nerve, a branch of the mandibular branch of the trigeminal nerve. As the tensor tympani is supplied by motor fibers of the trigeminal nerve, it does not receive fibers from the trigeminal ganglion, which has sensory fibers only.

=== Development ===
The tensor tympani muscle develops from mesodermal tissue in the 1st pharyngeal arch.

== Function ==
The tensor tympani acts to damp the noise produced by chewing. When tensed, the muscle pulls the malleus medially, tensing the tympanic membrane and damping vibration in the ear ossicles and thereby reducing the perceived amplitude of sounds. It is not to be confused by the acoustic reflex, but can be activated by the startle reflex.

=== Voluntary control ===
Contracting muscles produce vibration and sound. Slow twitch fibers produce 10 to 30 contractions per second (equivalent to 10 to 30 Hz sound frequency). Fast twitch fibers produce 30 to 70 contractions per second (equivalent to 30 to 70 Hz sound frequency).

Some individuals can voluntarily produce this rumbling sound by contracting the muscle. According to the National Institute of Health, "voluntary control of the tensor tympani muscle is an extremely rare event". The rumbling sound can also be heard when the neck or jaw muscles are highly tensed as when yawning deeply. This phenomenon has been known since (at least) 1884. In a 2013 case of a 27-year old man who was complaining of tinnitus, otolaryngologists discovered that he was voluntarily contracting the tensor tympani muscles in both ears at the same time. In a 2017 study of five volunteers, otorhinolaryngologists found "a low frequency conductive hearing loss" during voluntary contraction of the muscle.

=== Involuntary control (tympanic reflex) ===
The tympanic reflex helps prevent damage to the inner ear by muffling the transmission of low frequency vibrations from the tympanic membrane to the oval window. The reflex has a response time of 40 milliseconds, not fast enough to protect the ear from sudden loud noises such as an explosion or gunshot.

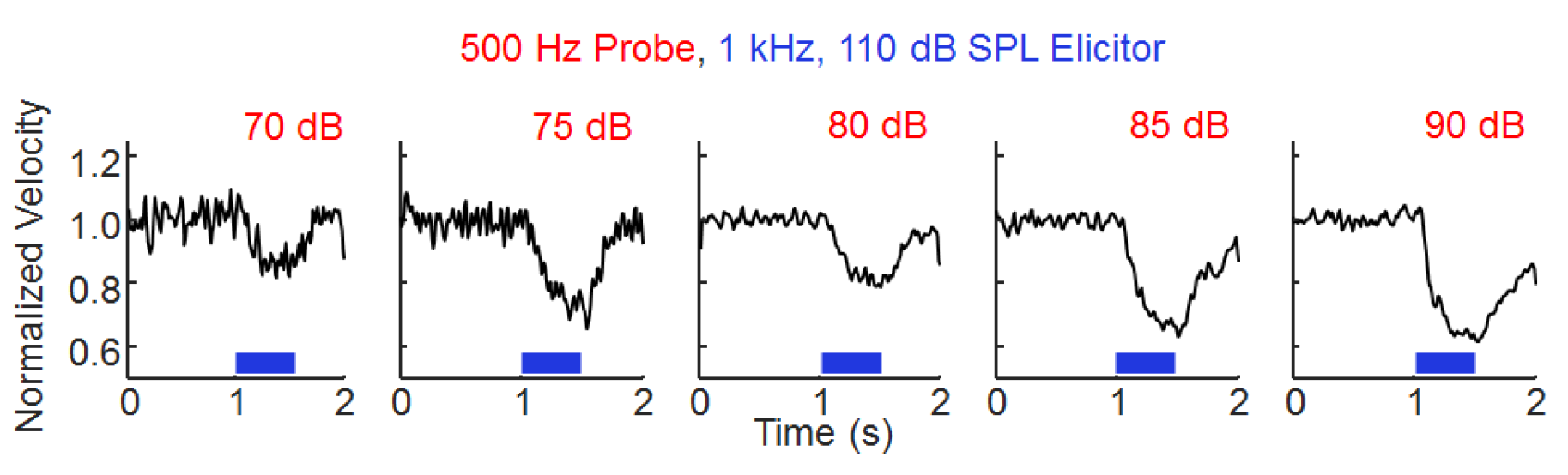
Examples of the onset and recovery of the acoustic reflex measured with a laser Doppler velocimetry system

Thus, the reflex most likely developed to protect early humans from loud thunder claps which do not happen in a split second.

The reflex works by contracting the muscles of the middle ear, the tensor tympani and the stapedial muscle. However, the stapedial muscle is innervated by the facial nerve while the tensor tympani is innervated by the trigeminal nerve. The tensor tympani pulls the manubrium of the malleus inwards and tightens it while the stapedial muscle pulls the stapes inward. This tightening damps the sound vibration that is allowed to penetrate the cochlea. Withdrawal from drugs such as benzodiazepines had been known to cause tonic tensor tympani syndrome (TTTS) during withdrawal. The tympanic reflex will also activate when loud vibrations are generated by the person themselves. The tensor tympani can often be observed vibrating while shouting at an increased volume, damping the sound somewhat.

== Clinical significance ==
In many people with hyperacusis, an increased activity develops in the tensor tympani muscle in the middle ear as part of the startle response to some sounds. This lowered reflex threshold for tensor tympani contraction is activated by the perception/anticipation of loud sound, and is called tonic tensor tympani syndrome (TTTS). In some people with hyperacusis, the tensor tympani muscle can contract just by thinking about a loud sound. Following exposure to intolerable sounds, this contraction of the tensor tympani muscle tightens the ear drum, which can lead to the symptoms of ear pain/a fluttering sensation/a sensation of fullness in the ear (in the absence of any middle or inner ear pathology).

The mechanisms behind dysfunction of the tympanic tensor muscle and their consequences are hypothesized. However, in a published study, researchers studied the case of an acoustic shock whose mechanisms suggest dysfunction of the tympanic tensor muscle. This study appears to be the first to provide experimental support suggesting that middle ear muscles (MEM) may behave abnormally after an acoustic shock. It is suggested that abnormal contractions (e.g. tonic contractions) of the tympanic tensor muscle may trigger neurogenic inflammation. Indeed, fibers with substances P and CGRP were found in close proximity.

Involuntary movement of the muscle causes Middle Ear Myoclonus.

== Additional images ==
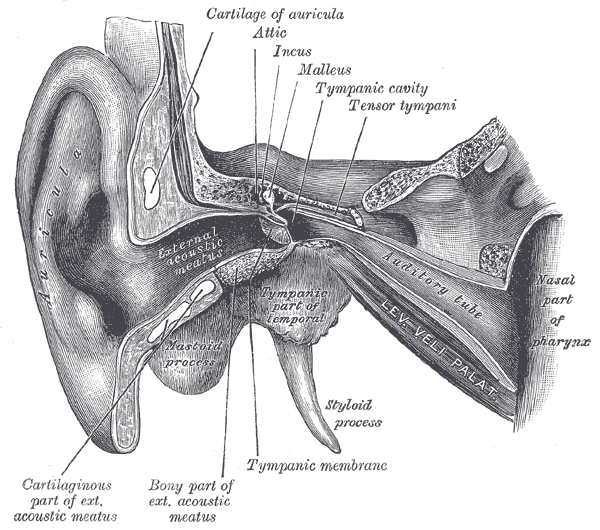
External and middle ear, opened from the front. Right side.

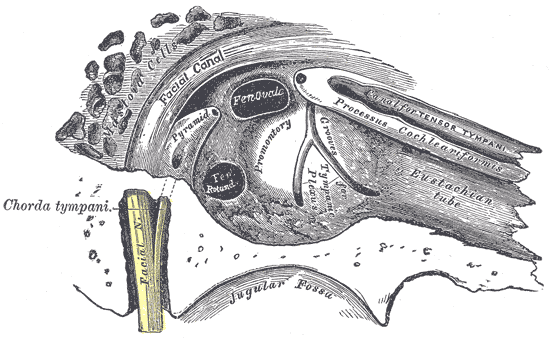
View of the inner wall of the tympanum (enlarged)

== See also ==
- Hearing
- Middle ear
- Ossicles
- Stapedius – the other major muscle in the middle ear
- Acoustic reflex
- Hyperacusis
