= Dewi Chien =

Taiwanese singer and actress

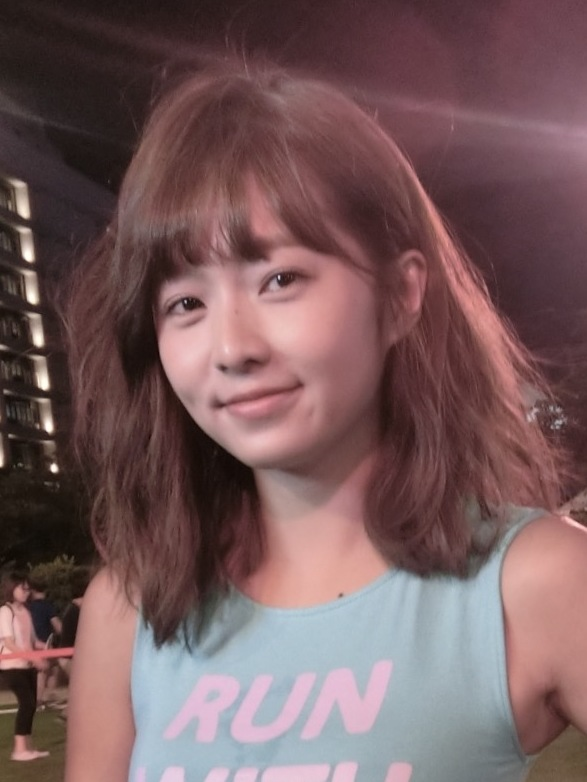
- Born: 9 March 1992 (age 34); Beitun, Taichung, Taiwan
- Occupations: Singer, actress
- Years active: 2006–present
- Spouse: unnamed (m. 2020)
- Children: 2

Chinese name
- Traditional Chinese: 簡廷芮
- Simplified Chinese: 简廷芮
Transcriptions
Standard Mandarin
- Hanyu Pinyin: Jiǎn Tíngruì
- Musical career
- Labels: Alfa Entertainment; HIM International Music

Dewi Chien (Chinese: 簡廷芮; born 9 March 1992) is a Taiwanese singer and actress. She is member of musical duo Dears. She is known for her role as Tao Min-min in the 2015 film Our Times.

== Filmography ==
=== Television series ===
- The Devil Punisher (2020) as Seven Star Sword Spirit / Xiao-qi
- Someday or One Day (2019-2020) as Vicky
- Miss in Kiss (2017) as Bai Sha-sui

=== Films ===
- Fall in Love at First Kiss (2019)
- Come Back to Your World (2016)
- Our Times (2015) as Tao Min-min
- Secret Piano (2012)
