= Auditory Hazard Assessment Algorithm for Humans =

The Auditory Hazard Assessment Algorithm for Humans (AHAAH) is a mathematical model of the human auditory system that calculates the risk to human hearing caused by exposure to impulse sounds, such as gunfire and airbag deployment. It was developed by the U.S. Army Research Laboratory (ARL) to assess the effectiveness of hearing protection devices and aid the design of machinery and weapons to make them safer for the user.

In 2015, the AHAAH became one of the two metrics used by the U.S. Department of Defense to approve the Military Standard (MIL-STD) 1474E for regulating maximum noise level exposure from military systems. It is also used by the Society of Automotive Engineers to calculate the hazard of airbag noise and by the Israeli Defense Force for impulse noise analysis.

== Overview ==
Noise-induced hearing loss (NIHL) typically occurs when the auditory system experiences an elevation of hearing thresholds due to exposure to high-level noise, a phenomenon known as a temporary threshold shift (TTS), and does not return to normal threshold levels. The damage to the auditory system can vary depending on the type of noise exposure. Unlike the continuous background noise often found in industrial environments, the impulse noise produced by weapons and firearms demonstrates a very high pressure level within a very short duration of time, typically around a few milliseconds. As a result, near-field peak levels measured close to the muzzle of a weapon can range from 150 dB for handheld weapons and over 180 dB for heavy artillery. By comparison, noises from industrial settings were measured to have peak levels of 113 to 120 dB.

In order to protect soldiers from hearing loss, the U.S. Army adhered to the Military Standard (MIL-STD) 1474, which defined the maximum noise levels permitted to be produced by military systems. However, human volunteer studies demonstrated that the standard used since 1997, the MIL-STD-1474D, overestimated the hazard associated with impulse noise exposure. The subsequent overprotection of the ears based on inaccurate evaluations of hearing loss risk was believed to potentially hamper verbal communication between military personnel on the battlefield and reduce situational awareness. The AHAAH was developed to more accurately assess the hazard to the human ear from impulse noise by incorporating the acoustic and physiological characteristics of the ear in its analysis, which were not accounted for in previous metrics. The AHAAH model and an equivalent A-weighted energy method, L_{Aeq100ms} were included in the revised MIL-STD-1474E.

== Development ==
The AHAAH model was first developed in 1987 by the U.S. Army Human Engineering Laboratory (HEL), which later became part of the U.S. Army Research Laboratory (ARL), to investigate the complex interactions between the outer, middle, and inner ears and understand the process behind hearing loss on the level of the cochlea. Originally designed to function as an electro-acoustic model of the ear, AHAAH was the product of numerous noise exposure experiments which, in turn, guided the direction of future studies. The first version of the AHAAH was modeled after pre-existing, available data on the cat ear since much of the physiological and acoustic characteristics and values for the cat were more well known at the time compared to that of humans and could be studied more directly. Additionally, the ears of mammals were similar enough that only modest adaptations to the model were required to adjust for human ear anatomy. By 1997, the AHAAH was modified into a human model that accounted for the structure of the human ear. In subsequent years, the AHAAH underwent several validation tests, including The Albuquerque Studies, which was one of the largest early studies of human impulse noise exposure and led to the creation of a large systematic database that documented the effects of impulse noise on humans. Results from these studies according to the developer have demonstrated that the AHAAH was correct in 95 percent of the tests with protective hearing and 96 percent of the instances for all tests. In contrast, the MIL-STD-1474D method of hazard prediction was shown to have been correct only 38 percent of the time in protected hearing tests.

== Operation ==
The AHAAH model estimates the auditory hazard of impulsive sounds by modelling their transmission using a one dimensional electroacoustic model of the outer, middle and inner ear. This wave motion analysis applies the Wentzel-Kramers-Brillouin (WKB) wave dynamics method. The motion of the stapes footplate is estimated and the WKB approximation is used to estimate basilar membrane motions assuming a linear cochlea network model. The output of the AHAAH model is auditory risk units (ARUs), which are related to summation of the upward displacements of the basilar membrane at 23 different locations. The ARU for any waveform will be reported as the maximum ARUs at any of the 23 locations. According to the developers, the recommended limit for daily occupational exposures is 200 ARUs, while any dose greater than 500 ARUs is predicted to produce permanent hearing loss.

The AHAAH model consisted of a set of proven algorithms that accounted for a variety of exposure conditions that influenced the risk of a permanent threshold risk, such as noise attenuation caused by hearing protection devices and reflexive middle ear muscle (MEM) contractions that occur before the onset of the stimulus being received that reduce the damage to the ear in preparation of the sound. Unlike previous energy-based damage models, the AHAAH could also accurately predict the scope of the damage by analyzing the pressure-time dependence of the sound wave. Through this method, the model was able to determine why a low level of energy at the ear canal entrance was much more hazardous than a higher level of energy at the ear canal entrance of an ear protected by ear muffs. The model discovered that the former featured a different pressure-time dependence than the latter that was able to more efficiently transfer energy through the middle ear. The MEMC are not prevalent in the population of normal hearing persons, 95% prevalence with a 95% confidence interval. The early activation of the MEMC occurred in 2 out of 50 subjects in a countdown study.

Depending on the presence of hearing protection devices, whether the sound came unexpectedly, and where the sound originated—whether in free field, at the ear canal entrance, or at the eardrum position—the AHAAH model could predict the displacements in the inner ear because it was conformal with the structure of the human ear. For free field, the model assumed that the sound arrived straight down the ear canal and calculated the pressure history at the eardrum, taking in the energy transferred to the stapes as input to the inner ear. For waves recorded at the ear canal entrance or at the eardrum, the model took into account the proper origin point of the sound in the circuit diagram. The displacement of the basilar membrane is calculated from the displacement of the stapes and the AHU is then determined by measuring the total displacement of the waves at 23 different locations on the organ of Corti in the inner ear. The effect of the impulse sound can be displayed to create a visual representation of the damage process as it occurs.

== The Albuquerque Studies ==
Conducted in the 1990s and sponsored by the U.S. Army Medical Research and Materiel Command, the Albuquerque Studies were a series of human volunteer studies that aimed to establish new limits on the acceptable level of exposure to impulse noise produced by heavy weapons. The studies took place at Kirkland Air Force Base in Albuquerque, New Mexico, where participants were exposed to four different pressure-time signatures at seven different intensity levels and at various successions and sequences. The data collected from these studies formed a large database used to evaluate the performance of the AHAAH model. The experiment consisted of exposures to free-field impulse waveforms produced by explosive charges at distances of 5, 3, and 1 meters while wearing hearing protection. The 5m exposure was performed with a bare charge suspended above the ground and the subjects wore an unmodified earmuff with the left ear towards the charge. The 5m exposure was repeated with a modified earmuff that included a series of small tubes inserted through the earmuff cushion to simulate a poorly fit earmuff. The 3m and 1m exposures used the modified earmuff and the charges were detonated at the base of a tube pointed vertically. The left ears of the subjects were positioned 1m or 3m from the lip of the tube and 1 inch (2.54 cm) or 3 inches (7.62 cm) above the top edge of the tube. The fourth exposure condition was a reverberant environment with the participants seated at the end of a 3-meter long steel tube that opened into a concrete bunker. The explosive charged were detonated outside the end of the 3m tube. Various conditions were accounted for, such as the distance of the participant's ear from the tube, the acoustics of the surrounding environment, the level of hearing protection, and the number of impulses, establishing a matrix of possible exposures. An audiogram was used before and after each exposure to measure the threshold and the resulting threshold shift. The pressure-time signatures were measured using bare gauges for all exposure conditions. According to the analysis of the Albuquerque Studies by AHAAH's developer, the AHAAH model correctly predicted the acoustic hazards in 95 percent of the cases, while the MIL-STD-1474D was correct in only 38 percent of the cases and the A-weighted energy method was correct in only 25 percent of the cases. With different selection of the exposure limits, the equivalent A-weighted energy can yield similar accuracy. For all three approaches, the errors mainly stemmed from the methods overpredicting the danger of the hazard.

== Controversy ==
The AHAAH is the subject of controversy in regards to its use to assess acoustic hazards. In 2003, a NATO research study on impulse noise found that the AHAAH produced unsatisfactory results for several exposure conditions, and the concluding report contained conflicting opinions from several experts. A 2010 review by the American Institute of Biological Sciences (AIBS) also concluded that while the AHAAH model was a step in the right direction in terms of incorporating factors such as the middle ear muscle contractions in its analysis, it was not yet fully developed and validated. According to the AIBS, there were concerns as to whether the AHAAH model was capable of modeling the acoustic hazard of a complex military environment with continuous noise from various different machinery and weapons being produced simultaneously. In 2012, a review by the National Institute for Occupational Safety and Health (NIOSH) argued that the MEM contractions that were used by the AHAAH to justify increasing the recommended maximum noise levels were not present in enough people to be applied as a valid form of analysis. The report also noted that the AHAAH did not adequately take into account the effects of secondary exposure, such as adjacent shooters and range safety personnel. As of 2015, the AHAAH model has not been adopted by the NATO community.

Both NIOSH and the US Army Aeromedical Research Laboratories funded research to investigate the classical conditioning that has been integral to the warned AHAAH model. In the warned mode, the middle ear muscles are assumed to be already contracted. In the unwarned mode, the middle ear muscles are contracted after a loud sound exceeds a threshold of about 134 dB peak SPL. Several studies conducted between 2014 and 2020 have examined the prevalence and reliability of the MEMC. According to a nationally representative survey of more than 15,000 persons, the prevalence of the acoustic reflex measured in persons aged 18 to 30 was less than 90%. A follow-on study that carefully assessed 285 persons with normal hearing concluded that "acoustic reflexes are not pervasive and should not be included in damage risk criteria and health assessments for impulsive noise." The anticipatory contraction integral to the warned response is not reliable in persons with normal hearing. The completion of the USAARL live fire exposure study demonstrated that the early activation of the MEMC was not present in 18 of 19 subjects during tests with an M4-rifle using live ammunition. Experienced shooters according to the hypothesis of the AHAAH developers would exhibit an early contraction that precedes the trigger pull. The warned hypothesis was demonstrated to be insufficiently prevalent to merit including the MEMC in subsequent damage risk criteria.
