= Tinnitracks =

Digital therapy app designed for tinnitus treatment

- Developer: Sonormed GmbH
- Type: Health care

Tinnitracks is a digital therapy app designed for the treatment of tinnitus through audio therapy. Treatment involves listening to music at specific frequencies that cause a patient's tinnitus to be filtered out. The app is designed to take the music a patient regularly listens to and adapt it to a specified frequency, determined by visiting an ENT specialist, that will help filter out the patient's tinnitus. The software was developed and is marketed by Sonormed GmbH.

The concept behind this treatment has been developed and researched by the University of Muenster, Germany. Tinnitracks was developed based on this research and provides access to the treatment beyond academic research programs.

== Technology ==
Patients with tinnitus can use the Tinnitracks software to filter their individual tinnitus frequency from their music songs. By processing a song, the defined frequency is extracted, creating a gap called a "notch" in the frequency profile that covers the exact tinnitus frequency, as well as about an octave around it. Afterwards, the software checks if the audio profile of the song meets the criteria for the tinnitus treatment. Accuracy of frequency measurement is paramount in the process, which is why patients are required to visit ENT specialists or acousticians to create an accurate tinnitus audiogram.

== Treatment ==
Tinnitracks is based on the "Tailor-Made Notched Music Training" ("TMNMT") system. This approach uses filtered music to reduce the tinnitus volume. As emphasised by the name, TMNMT ("Tailor-Made"), the importance of individualisation in calibrating the initial set-up is crucial, and refers both to the patient's individual tinnitus frequency profile and the use of the patient's favourite music. By filtering from the music, frequencies which match the frequency profile of the patient's tinnitus, those over-reactive, or misfiring, areas of the auditory cortex become less reactive. The aim is to eliminate the stimulation of those specific cortical areas by filtering out the frequencies that stimulate them.

== Awards and recognition ==
It has received some awards, and won several start-up competitions, among them the SXSW Accelerator in the category "Digital Health & Life Sciences Technologies" at the 2015 South by Southwest Interactive Festival.
