= Speaker pillow =

A speaker pillow is a pillow that incorporates loudspeakers. It is generally designed as an alternative to headphones connected to portable media players. A speaker pillow is intended to improve sleep as it is more comfortable than other options for sound. Example uses include playing audiobooks, podcasts, or music to help fall asleep.

== Types ==
Pillow speakers come in 2 formats; wired and wireless. Wired Pillow speakers are often cheaper but lower quality. Wireless ones such as DreamPod Pillow Speaker connect to the user's phone via Bluetooth, meaning no wires are required.

== See also ==
- Tinnitus masker
