= Dears (band) =

Taiwanese duo

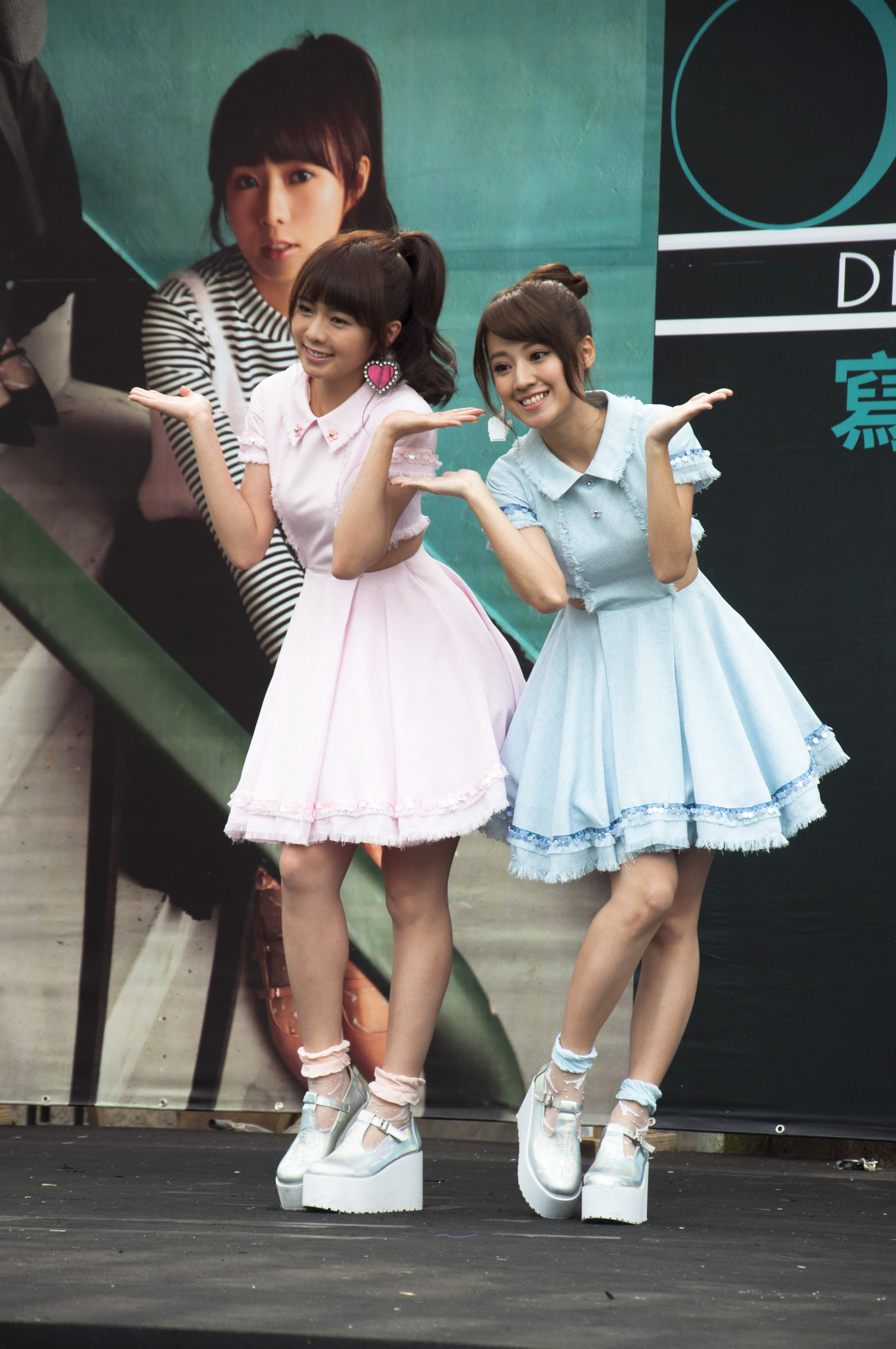

Background information
- Origin: Taiwan
- Genres: Mandopop
- Years active: 2014–present
- Labels: Alfa Music International
- Members: Dewi Chien; Dabe Chen

Dears is a Taiwanese duo formed in 2014 by Alfa Music. The duo consists of Dewi Chien and Dabe Chen. They released their first EP, Dears on August 16, 2014. On January 22, 2016, Dears released their second EP, Say Yes.
