= Hyperacusis =

Increased sensitivity to sound and decreased tolerance of noise

- Other names: Hyperacousis
- Specialty: Otolaryngology
- Differential diagnosis: Sensory processing disorder
- Treatment: Tinnitus Retraining Therapy or TRT, Round and Oval Window Reinforcement

Hyperacusis is an increased sensitivity to sound (often to the point of pain) and a low tolerance for environmental noise. Definitions of hyperacusis can vary significantly; it often revolves around damage to or dysfunction of the stapes bone, stapedius muscle or tensor tympani. It is often categorized into four subtypes: loudness, pain (also called noxacusis), annoyance, and fear. It can be a highly debilitating hearing disorder.

There are a variety of causes and risk factors, with the most common being exposure to loud noise. It is often coincident with tinnitus. Proposed mechanisms in the literature involve dysfunction in the brain, inner ear, or middle ear.

Little is known about the prevalence of hyperacusis, in part due to the degree of variation in the term's definition. Reported prevalence estimates vary widely, and further research is needed to obtain strong epidemiological data.

== Signs and symptoms ==
Hyperacusis symptoms can include an increased perception of the loudness of sounds (loudness hyperacusis), pain (noxacusis/pain hyperacusis/sound-induced otalgia), annoyance, and/or fear in response to sounds by which most people are unaffected. It may affect one or both ears. The majority of patients experience bilateral symptoms but often have one ear that is more affected than the other. Annoyance hyperacusis is often considered synonymous with misophonia. Fear hyperacusis is often considered synonymous with phonophobia. Many researchers more narrowly define hyperacusis to only include loudness hyperacusis and pain hyperacusis.

Hyperacusis can also be accompanied by tinnitus. The latter is more common and there are important differences between their involved mechanisms.

Hyperacusis can result in anxiety and stress. Avoidant behavior is often a response to prevent the effects of hyperacusis and this can include avoiding social situations.

=== Loudness hyperacusis ===
Loudness hyperacusis is characterized by an increased perception of the loudness of sounds. It is often associated with certain volumes and/or frequencies. It can occur in children and adults, and can be either "short-term" in a duration of weeks to less than a year before recovery, or, less commonly, "long-term," spanning years and in some cases becoming permanent. Sensitivity is often different between ears.

=== Noxacusis ===
In some instances, hyperacusis is accompanied by pain, which is known as noxacusis. Noxacusis is characterized by pain resulting from sounds, often initiated at certain volumes or frequencies. Pain can be immediate or delayed, and it sometimes persists for an extended period of time following exposure. Pain can be acute or chronic, and is often described as stabbing, burning, throbbing, or aching. In healthy listeners, pain from sound is not typically experienced until the volume exceeds approximately 120 decibels.

Individuals experiencing noxacusis report less improvement over time and fewer benefits from sound therapy compared to individuals with loudness hyperacusis.

=== Loudness discomfort level ===
The threshold of sound at which discomfort is initially experienced; measured in decibels (dB). These tests may cause a setback.

=== Setback ===
A setback is a temporary exacerbation of symptoms, a worsening of the perception of loudness or pain from sound, often due to a particular noise exposure. Setback prevention is an important focus among those affected. Efforts to avoid setbacks commonly include using hearing protection and avoiding loud noises. Pain hyperacusis patients experience setbacks more frequently than patients with loudness hyperacusis.

=== Associated conditions ===
Some conditions that are associated with hyperacusis include:

- Acoustic shock
- Adverse drug reaction
- Anxiety
- Attention deficit hyperactivity disorder
- Autism spectrum
- Depression
- Endolymphatic hydrops
- Fetal alcohol spectrum disorder
- Hypothyroidism
- Lyme disease
- Migraine
- Ménière's disease
- Misophonia
- Multiple sclerosis
- Noise-induced hearing loss
- Posttraumatic stress disorder
- Severe head trauma
- Sjögren syndrome
- Superior canal dehiscence syndrome
- Systemic lupus erythematosus
- Tay–Sachs disease
- Temporomandibular joint disorder
- Tinnitus
- Tonic tensor tympani syndrome
- Trigeminal neuralgia
- Visual snow
- Williams syndrome

== Causes and risk factors ==
The most common cause of hyperacusis is overexposure to excessively high decibel (sound pressure) levels, which can cause acoustic trauma. An acoustic shock, which can lead to symptoms such as hyperacusis and ear pain, can also occur after exposure to an unexpected moderately loud to loud noise, even if this does not necessarily result in permanent cochlear damage.

Some affected people acquire hyperacusis suddenly as a result of taking ototoxic drugs (which can damage the cells responsible for hearing), Lyme disease, Ménière's disease, head injury, or surgery. Others are born with sound sensitivity or develop superior canal dehiscence syndrome. Bell's palsy can trigger hyperacusis if the associated flaccid paralysis affects the tensor tympani, and stapedius, two small muscles of the middle ear. Paralysis of the stapedius muscle prevents its function in dampening the oscillations of the ossicles, causing sound to be abnormally loud on the affected side. Age may also be a significant factor, with younger patients exhibiting more severe hyperacusis.

Recently, it has been discovered that individuals with one copy of the GJB2 (Cx26) genetic mutation exhibit hearing that is more sensitive than average, akin to hyperacusis. These individuals appear to be at greater risk for damage from noise.

Some psychoactive drugs such as LSD, methaqualone, benzodiazepines, or phencyclidine can cause hyperacusis. An antibiotic, ciprofloxacin, has also been seen to be a cause, known as ciprofloxacin-related hyperacusis. Benzodiazepine withdrawal syndrome is also a possible cause.

== Epidemiology ==
Prevalence estimates for hyperacusis vary widely in the literature, and further epidemiological data is needed. No gender differences have yet been established among hyperacusis patients. Hyperacusis appears to be more severe in younger patients.

== Possible mechanisms ==
=== Loudness hyperacusis ===
As one possible mechanism, adaptation processes in the auditory brain that influence the dynamic range of neural responses are assumed to be distorted by irregular input from the inner ear. This is mainly caused by hearing loss related damage in the inner ear. The mechanism behind hyperacusis is not currently known, but it is suspected to be caused by damage to the inner ear and cochlea.

=== Noxacusis ===
==== Inner ear theory ====
Type II afferent fibers of the cochlear nerve are not responsible for hearing like the type I afferent fibers. They are thought to be cochlear pain neurons. Gain of function of these type II afferent fibers may be caused by a flood of ATP after hair cell damage. Now sensitized, they react to the small amount of ATP released during the normal process of hearing. This may result in pain.

==== Middle ear theory ====
Noreña et al. (2018) propose a model that may account for sound-induced pain and a constellation of other symptoms often experienced after an acoustic shock, acoustic trauma, and potentially other mechanisms of auditory damage. Symptoms may include a sense of fullness in the ear, tinnitus, and dizziness.

The model details how symptoms may be initiated by tensor tympani muscle damage or overload due to acoustic shock or trauma. Hypercontraction or hyperactivity of the muscle may cause an "ATP energy crisis". The muscle is then forced to create energy without sufficient oxygen, which results in the release of lactic acid into the middle ear space. This acidity can activate pain-sensing neurons. Muscle relaxation requires energy in the form of ATP. In the setting of low ATP, it is more difficult for the muscle to relax, which causes the cycle to continue. Via a cascade of events, the activated pain neurons can cause neurogenic inflammation, which may lead to additional pain. In this way, a "vicious circle" is created.

Pain from sound sometimes radiates to the face, scalp, and neck. This may be due to the trigeminocervical complex in the brainstem, which integrates input from and output to various regions of the head and neck, including the middle ear. Of note, the tensor tympani muscle is innervated by the trigeminal nerve. The model also explains how whiplash injuries, temporomandibular joint dysfunction, and other conditions affecting the head and neck regions may influence the function of the tensor tympani muscle and contribute to ear symptoms such as pain hyperacusis.

==== Cochlear afferents theory ====
Wood proposes that Type II cochlear afferents may be transmitting pain signals to the brain. She states that "she will continue to explore the activity of epithelial cells and type II cochlear afferent fibers as the cellular basis for pain hyperacusis."

== Diagnosis ==
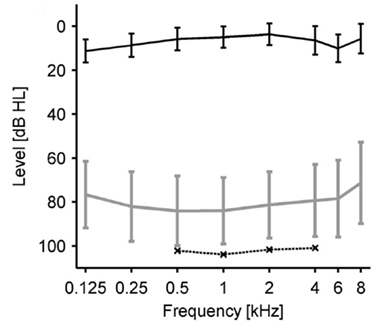
Loudness discomfort levels (LDLs): group data of hyperacusis patients without hearing loss. Upper line: average hearing thresholds. Lower long line: LDLs of this group. Lower short line: LDLs of a reference group with normal hearing.

The basic diagnostic test is similar to a normal audiogram. The difference is that, in addition to the hearing threshold at each test frequency, the lowest uncomfortable sound level is also measured. This level is called loudness discomfort level (LDL) or uncomfortable loudness level (ULL). In patients with hyperacusis this level is often considerably lower than in normal subjects, and usually across most parts of the auditory spectrum. However, there is not a consensus regarding what constitutes a normal LDL. The relationship between LDL's and self-reported ability to tolerate sounds in everyday life in unclear.

In addition to self-report questionnaires, audiologists may employ a variety of other techniques to evaluate auditory function in patients experiencing noise sensitivity. When conducting testing that involves the presentation of sounds, which may cause the patient discomfort or pain, it is vital to inform the patient of the volume and duration of sounds to be presented prior to testing. Care should be taken to begin with sounds of low volume, and volume should be increased gradually. The audiologist and patient should both be prepared to stop testing at any time, depending on the patient's symptoms.

== Management and treatment ==
There are currently no evidence-based guidelines regarding the treatment of patients with hyperacusis. The majority of audiologists report insufficient formal education in this area, likely due in part to the current lack of consensus in the literature regarding definitions and treatment of hyperacusis. Dr. Kelly Jahn surveyed 32 patients with severe pain hyperacusis and found that 95% of them had experienced a lack of empathy or support from doctors (20% somewhat agree and 75% strongly agree, with a 5% non response rate).

=== Avoidance and hearing protection ===
Setback prevention and reduction of pain symptoms are high priorities among those with hyperacusis and noxacusis, which is often managed through a combination of controlling the environment so as to avoid loud sounds, soundproofing, and wearing hearing protection, such as earplugs and safety earmuffs. Preliminary research has shown that individuals with pain hyperacusis can experience an exacerbation of their symptoms when not adequately protecting themselves against loud sounds.

There are diametrically opposing views on avoiding overuse of hearing protection and silence. Some audiologists may advise against using hearing protection in normal sound environments, claiming it can cause or worsen hyperacusis. This is based on a study in healthy volunteers and not individuals with preexisting loudness or pain hyperacusis.

=== Sound therapy ===
Sound therapy is sometimes recommended for those with hyperacusis, though there is limited evidence supporting its use. Its application among those with pain (noxacusis) should be used with caution. Tinnitus retraining therapy, a treatment originally used to treat tinnitus, uses broadband noise to treat hyperacusis. Pink noise can also be used to treat hyperacusis. By listening to broadband noise at soft levels for a disciplined period of time each day, some patients can rebuild (i.e., re-establish) their tolerances to sound. More research is needed on the efficacy of sound therapy techniques when hyperacusis is the primary complaint, rather than a secondary symptom, indicating that "no strong conclusions can be made" about its efficacy at this time. Importantly, individuals with pain hyperacusis are more likely than individuals with loudness hyperacusis to report worsening of their condition after the use of sound therapy.

=== Cognitive behavioral therapy ===
Another possible treatment is cognitive behavioral therapy (CBT), which may also be combined with sound therapy. However, randomized controlled trials with active control groups are still needed to establish the effectiveness of CBT for hyperacusis and the usefulness of CBT for noxacusis is not yet demonstrated in the scientific literature.

=== Surgery ===
Studies have shown improved loudness discomfort levels in patients with hyperacusis after round and oval window reinforcement.

A case of chronic ear pain associated with hyperacusis after exposure to loud noise at a concert was successfully treated with tympanic neurectomy.

=== Anecdotal medication data ===
The tricyclic anti-depressant clomipramine (brand name Anafranil) has been anecdotally useful for many people with hyperacusis. Both loudness hyperacusis and noxacusis have been successfully treated with this drug. A dosage of up to 200–250 mg daily for a sustained period of six to twelve months may be needed to cure hyperacusis. A possible mechanism of action of this drug is that clomipramine reduces reactions of the autonomic nervous system to sounds.

The drug ambroxol helps relieve the pain experienced by several pain hyperacusis patients.

=== Suicidal thoughts and treatment ===
Suicidal ideations are a risk factor in hyperacusis patients. Aazh and Moore (2018) interviewed 402 patients and 13% had indicated suicidal or self-harm ideations in the past 2 weeks. Hashir et al. (2019) subsequently interviewed 292 patients and found that 15.75% had expressed suicidal ideations in the previous two weeks of the study. They recommend screening for these issues. Jemma Rosewater suggests that patients are caught in a cycle where family and doctors encourage noise exposure, which causes increased pain and long-term worsening, and patients blame themselves for their "emotional problem." As psychiatric hospitals are noisy and can not make noise accommodations, ultimately hyperacusis patients may become worse instead of improving there.

== Stories of hyperacusis patients ==
The Hyperacusis Memorial Wall of Remembrance is dedicated to hyperacusis patients and their stories.

- Musician Jason DiEmilio, who recorded under the name Azusa Plane, had hyperacusis and ultimately went on to die by suicide due in part to his sensitivity to noise.
- Dietrich Hectors, a hyperacusis sufferer in Belgium, took his life in 2009, after years of struggling with catastrophic hyperacusis and tinnitus. A local government in Belgium made a short film based on his life to warn others of the dangers of hyperacusis and tinnitus.
- Musician Stephin Merritt has monaural hyperacusis in his left ear, which influences the instrumentation of his band, The Magnetic Fields, leads him to wear earplugs during performances and to cover his affected ear during audience applause.
- Vladimir Lenin, the Russian communist revolutionary, politician, and political theorist, was reported seriously ill by the latter half of 1921, having symptoms possibly consistent with hyperacusis, such as regular headache and insomnia.
- Musician Peter Silberman of The Antlers had hyperacusis and tinnitus resulting from Cochlear hydrops which put his musical career on hold until the conditions reduced down to a "manageable level".
- Racing driver Wolfgang Reip developed severe hyperacusis after several noise traumas during his racing career.
- Ludwig van Beethoven possibly suffered from hyperacusis alongside his hearing loss. In a letter, he wrote: "As soon as anybody shouts, I can't bear it. Heaven alone knows what is to become of me."
- British writer Linda Stratmann suffers from hyperacusis and reports noises "cut through her like a scalpel."
- Japanese man Ohama Matsuzo suffered from hyperacusis, leading to him murdering three neighbours over the sound of a piano.
- Musician Laura Ballance, bassist of rock band Superchunk and co-founder of Merge Records, suffers from hyperacusis and has quit touring as a result.
- Comedian Micheal Melrose is also known to be suffering from hyperacusis and tinnitus. Popular on Tik Tok @PostorDie.

== Hyperacusis Overview: World Hearing Day 2026 ==
In the context of global hearing health initiatives, such as World Hearing Day promoted annually by the World Health Organisation (WHO), hyperacusis has been increasingly recognised as a relevant public health issue due to its impact on communication, daily functioning, and quality of life. Although public discourse on hearing health has traditionally focused on hearing loss, conditions involving decreased sound tolerance, including hyperacusis, are gaining attention as they can be equally disabling. This is particularly relevant in contemporary discussions of neurodevelopmental conditions, such as autism spectrum disorder (ASD), in which auditory hypersensitivity is often reported. Individuals with ASD often exhibit atypical sensory processing, and increased sensitivity to sound may manifest as distress, avoidance behaviours, or pain in response to everyday auditory stimuli. This auditory intolerance can significantly interfere with social participation, educational engagement, and therapeutic interventions, thereby compounding the communication challenges commonly associated with ASD.

Increased awareness of hyperacusis in hearing healthcare settings is aligned with broader efforts to promote early identification, prevention of hearing injury, and appropriate treatment of sound-related disorders throughout life. From a public health perspective, integrating hyperacusis into global hearing health initiatives highlights the need for multidisciplinary approaches involving audiology, speech therapy, neurology, and mental health services. This is particularly important given the growing recognition of differences in sensory processing in populations with neurodevelopmental disorders and the increasing prevalence of environmental noise exposure worldwide. Addressing hyperacusis within the scope of hearing health awareness campaigns can contribute to better recognition, reduced stigma, and the development of more inclusive clinical and environmental accommodations for affected individuals.

In this context, the 2026 World Hearing Day theme, "From communities to classrooms: hearing care for all children: Act now so that no child is left behind due to ear or hearing problems," highlights childhood hearing care as a global public health priority. Although the official campaign focuses on universal childhood ear and hearing care, this framework can support inclusive strategies that address auditory sensitivity and sound intolerance in diverse pediatric populations, including those with neurodevelopmental conditions such as autism spectrum disorder.

== See also ==
- Auditory system
- Auditory hypersensitivity
- Health effects of noise pollution
- Tinnitus
- Misophonia
- Otoacoustic emission
- Safe listening
- Sensory processing sensitivity
- Recruitment (medicine)
- World Hearing Day
- Hearing Health Foundation
