= Tinnitus masker =

White noise sound generating device

Tinnitus maskers are a range of devices based on simple white noise machines used to add natural or artificial sound into a tinnitus sufferer's environment in order to mask or cover up the ringing. The noise is supplied by a sound generator, which may reside in or above the ear or be placed on a table or elsewhere in the environment. The noise is usually white noise or music, but in some cases, it may be patterned sound or specially tailored sound based on the characteristics of the person's tinnitus.

The perceived loudness of tinnitus, called sensation level (SL), is how much louder the tinnitus is above the ambient noise of the environment. By raising the ambient level of noise (playing white noise into the ear), the apparent loudness of tinnitus is reduced. The noise level is close to and usually somewhat louder than the perceived loudness of the tinnitus. The generated noise is designed to be a calming, less intrusive sound than the ringing or hissing of tinnitus. Depending on the loudness of the noise, tinnitus may be fully or partially masked. Tinnitus masking cannot reduce or eliminate tinnitus, only reduce awareness of it.

The efficacy of a tinnitus masker may depend on the wearer's capacity to experience residual inhibition, the temporary suppression of tinnitus in response to particular sound patterns.

The mechanism of sound masking can be explained by analogy with light. In a dark room where someone is turning a lamp on and off, the light will be obviously noticeable. However, if the overhead lights are turned on, turning on the lamp will no longer be as distracting because it has been "masked". While sound masking is an effective solution for a majority of those with tinnitus, it does not work for everyone.

== History ==
The concept that an external sound could suppress perception of an internal one was first realised clinically in the mid-1970s by Dr. Jack Vernon, when he reported that white noise was effective in alleviating tinnitus.

== Suppression vs. masking ==
Tinnitus suppression is different from but related to tinnitus masking. It is an acoustic or neurological effect that results in temporary suppression of tinnitus by listening to an appropriately tailored sound for a short period. After the sound is withdrawn, tinnitus may be fully (complete silence) or partially suppressed. Most (70–90%) of persons can experience the effect. There is usually a period of complete silence followed by a gradual return of tinnitus to its original level. The effect lasts for 5 minutes or less in 90% of persons but in rare cases, an hour or more. The period of complete silence is usually seconds to about a minute. If the trigger sound is repeated at intervals, tinnitus can be suppressed as long as the repetition lasts.

=== Residual inhibition ===
The residual inhibition (RI) effect, first noted in 1903, is the capacity of a sound of the right frequency and intensity to briefly attenuate or suppress tinnitus. To distinguish the tailored sound used for inhibition from the broadband undifferentiated sound employed in tinnitus maskers, it is usually referred to as the 'trigger' or 'quieting' sound. The trigger sound is closely matched to the pitch and spectrum of the tinnitus, and as loud or somewhat louder than the perceived loudness of the tinnitus. The trigger sound is applied to the ear or ears with tinnitus and typically lasts a minute or two. Not everyone can experience RI; for those who do not, tinnitus masking is likely to be ineffective.

== Acoustic qualities ==
Two qualities of a tinnitus masker need to be taken into account: how effective the masking is, and how intrusive or distracting the generated sound itself is.

The masking sound may have various temporal, spectral, and amplitudinal characteristics. In some cases, the sound is tuned to the pitch, loudness and other qualities of the tinnitus. However, frequencies widely divergent from the tinnitus frequency may also mask the tinnitus, if they are of sufficient loudness. The minimum energy (or loudness) mask is usually one closely matched to the central frequency and bandwidth of the tinnitus. But it has also been discovered that a tinnitus mask close to the frequency of the tinnitus can be ineffective, while a masker with a different frequency or bandwidth effectively masks the tinnitus. This indicates different origins of tinnitus.

Tinnitus maskers may use music or natural sounds, wide band white or pink noise, narrow band white noise, a notched soundfield, frequency or amplitude modulated sound, intermittent pulsed sound, or other patterned sound. Temporally patterned sound may be more effective than white noise or background music in masking tinnitus.

Studies have found that bandpass maskers are less annoying than pure tone maskers, that the annoyance rating of bandpass maskers is proportional to bandwidth, that intermittent maskers were more annoying than continuous ones, and that control over the center frequency and bandwidth was important in minimizing the annoyance of maskers.

=== Limitations ===
In addition to the spectrum of masking sound, the amplitude determines the degree of masking achieved. In some cases, the required masking amplitude is so high as to cause discomfort to the user of the sound generator, and the tinnitus is therefore considered unmaskable.

The frequency and other characteristics of tinnitus can vary over time, and the shifts can be temporary or permanent. They may also be cyclical. Therefore, the optimal tinnitus mask may need to be adjusted periodically, within days, hours, or even minutes. So a fixed recording (i.e. CD, DVD or audio file) of a tinnitus mask is not a very efficacious application.

There are also safety issues associated with use of tinnitus maskers: the "safe" level of continuous sound depends on the duration of the sound. For maskers worn continuously, or most of the day, a safe level is no more than 70 dB, in accordance with EPA maximum safe exposure level for 24-hour environmental sound. Maskers louder than 45 dB or so (the ambient background level of an average home living area) may start to interfere with understanding conversation (about 60 dB).

Masking of high frequency tinnitus (>6,000 Hz) is difficult because of the resonance characteristics of the human ear as well as high frequency limitations of in-ear devices. The ear has a resonance frequency (highest frequency response) at 3,000 Hz and rolls off at a very steep 26 dB/octave on the high frequency side. Unfortunately, most tinnitus is associated with hearing loss, and most hearing loss and tinnitus is high frequency. Most maskers are limited to about 6,000 Hz of effective output. Higher frequency output results in increasing distortion, and may cause rejection of the device.

=== Minimum masking level ===
The minimum masking level (MML) is the minimum amplitude of narrowband noise centered on the tinnitus pitch (or frequency range) necessary to completely mask the tinnitus.

== Devices ==
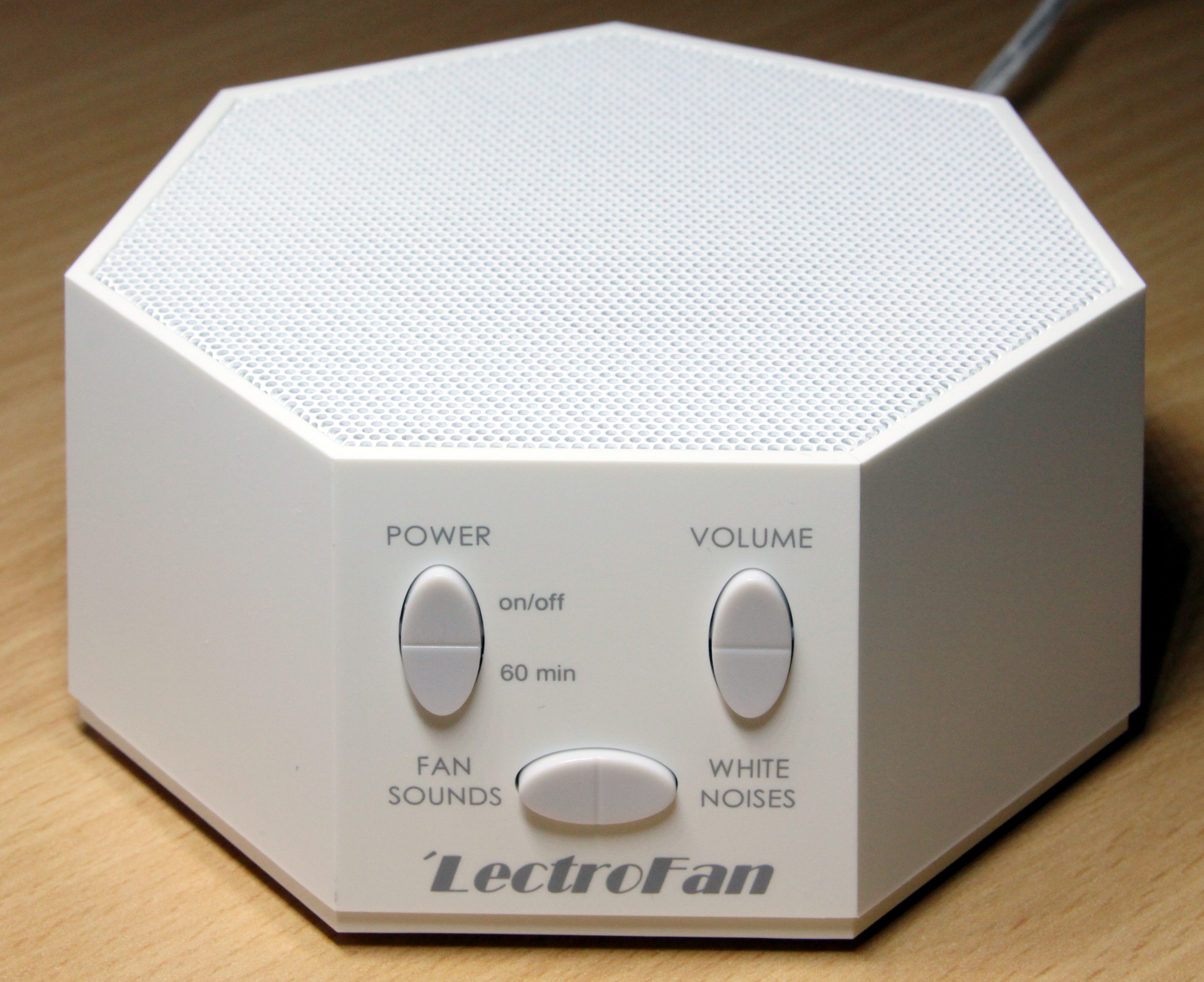
A LectroFan white noise machine

Tinnitus maskers are commonly used by tinnitus sufferers when trying to sleep or relax, as it is within these quiet environments that the tinnitus is at its most noticeable. They commonly take the form of CD or MP3 recordings, or bedside noise generators. When used in conjunction with a sound pillow (which contains small embedded speakers) they can mask a person's tinnitus sounds without disturbing his/her partner.

These masker devices use soothing natural sounds such as ocean surf, rainfall or synthetic sounds such as white noise, pink noise, or brown noise to help the auditory system become less sensitive to tinnitus and promote relaxation by reducing the contrast between tinnitus sounds and background sound.

More advanced software based tinnitus maskers can use a combination of natural and synthetic sounds or a filtered noise generator tailored to mask the specific frequencies at which the tinnitus signal is experienced.

Some sufferers require masking at all times. These people may employ wearable hearing aids which amplify ambient sound, generate low level wide band sounds such as white noise, or combination devices that mix both functions into one device.

A standard hearing aid may be used for tinnitus masking; the tuning and amplification characteristics are different than when one is used in compensation for hearing loss. A study by Jalilvand in 2015, showed that hearing aids instead of tinnitus maskers used to amplify sounds helped with the perception of tinnitus for veterans with blast-induced tinnitus.

Sound generators (masking devices) have received Class II approval from the FDA. However, they are considered to be "experimental, investigational, or unproven" therapies.

=== In-ear headphones ===
Bose Sleepbuds II comes with an app that streams white noise (and soundscapes, and ambient music).

=== Vibration maskers ===
There is one report of a bone conduction vibration masker that transmits a 60 Hz fundamental with adjustable harmonics up to 1000 Hz. A commercial device based on the phenomenon (Aurex3) was approved by the FDA.

=== High frequency audio and ultrasonic bone conduction maskers ===
A new development in tinnitus management is the use of high audio (10–20 kHz) or ultrasonic (20–100 kHz) via bone conduction.

== Efficacy ==
A 2012 Cochrane Review stated the available studies do not show strong evidence of the efficacy of sound therapy including tinnitus maskers in tinnitus management.

== Clinical practice ==
Audiologic Tinnitus Management (ATM) is a clinical protocol for management of tinnitus involving counselling and sound therapy including tinnitus maskers.

== Research ==
Neural Plasticity and Cortical Remapping – tinnitus is associated with cortical reorganization after hearing loss.

== Alternatives ==
- Transcranial magnetic stimulation has been used with limited success in treatment of tinnitus.
- Tinnitus retraining therapy uses a partial form of sound masking in conjunction with counselling

== See also ==
- Auditory masking
- Neurologic music therapy
- Speaker pillow
