= List of people with tinnitus =

This is a list of notable people that have been diagnosed with tinnitus.

- Ryan Adams
- Steve Aoki
- Richard Attenborough
- Igor Balis
- Thomas Bangalter
- Blixa Bargeld
- Jeff Beck
- Halle Berry
- Ludwig van Beethoven
- Cilla Black
- Bono
- Peter Brown
- Dolly Buster
- Bilinda Butcher
- Gerard Butler
- Nick Cave
- Louis-Ferdinand Céline
- Eric Clapton
- Ben Cohen
- Phil Collins
- Carl Craig
- Charles Darwin (see Charles Darwin's health)
- Bob Dylan
- Dave Grohl
- Colin Greenwood
- John Densmore
- Al Di Meola
- Danny Elfman
- John Entwistle
- Andrew Falkous
- Till Fellner
- Ira Flatow
- Kirsty Gallacher
- Liam Gallagher
- Noel Gallagher
- Boy George
- Paul Gilbert
- Gary Glitter
- Vincent van Gogh
- Jeff Gordon
- Rachel Goswell
- Francisco de Goya
- Charlie Haden
- Ayumi Hamasaki
- Kirk Hammett
- Sam Harris
- James Hetfield
- Howard Hughes
- Mike Joyce
- Joey Jordison
- Garrison Keillor
- DeForest Kelley
- Martin Kemp
- Myles Kennedy
- Anthony Kiedis
- Steve Kilbey
- Larry Lamb
- Kenny Larkin
- David Letterman
- Huey Lewis
- Rush Limbaugh
- Demi Lovato
- Arjen Anthony Lucassen
- Steve Lukather
- Martin Luther
- Paddy McAloon
- Josh Malina
- Chris Martin
- Steve Martin
- Joseph Mawle
- Martin McGuinness
- Seán McLoughlin
- Stephin Merritt
- Michelangelo
- Roger Miller
- Liza Minnelli
- Moby
- Derek Mooney
- Bob Mould
- Leonard Nimoy
- Noodles
- Ozzy Osbourne
- Andy Partridge
- Tim Powles
- Ian Punnett
- Tony Randall
- Ronald Reagan
- Keanu Reeves
- Jim Reid
- Susanna Reid
- Trent Reznor
- Peter Robinson
- Mick Ronson
- Francis Rossi
- Jimmy Savile
- Joe Scarborough
- Neal Schon
- Robert Schumann
- Samantha Shannon
- Peter Silberman
- William Shatner
- Alan Shepard
- Kevin Shields
- Bedřich Smetana
- Sylvester Stallone
- Vivian Stanshall
- Sting
- Jack Straw
- Barbra Streisand
- Tom Tancredo
- Roger Taylor
- Devin Townsend
- Pete Townshend
- KT Tunstall
- Lars Ulrich
- Ville Valo
- Jo Whiley
- will.i.am
- Thom Yorke
- Neil Young
