= Hyposensitivity =

Decreased sensitivity to sensory stimuli

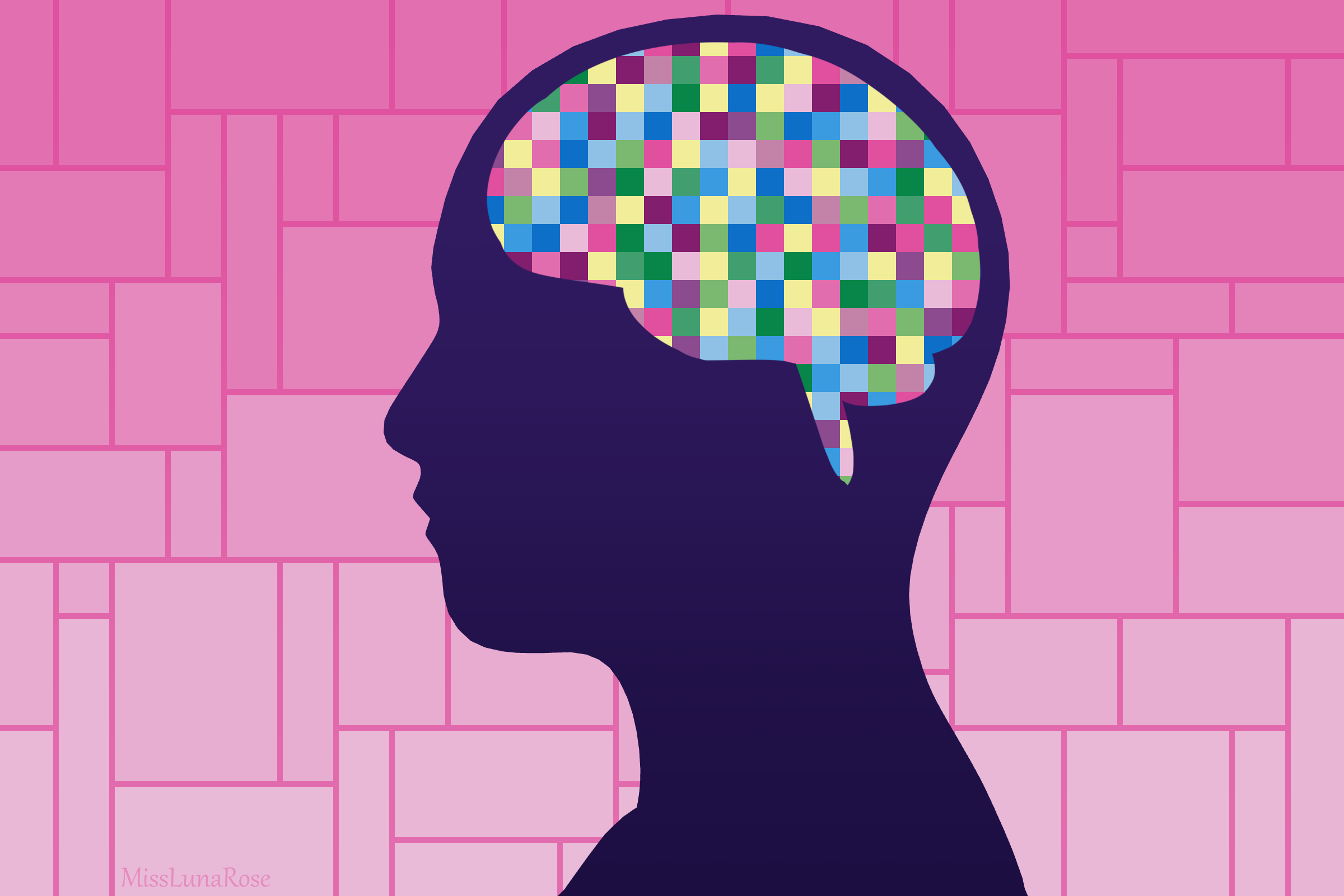
Hyposensitivity can affect how you perceive and navigate the world around you.

Hyposensitivity, also known as Sensory under-responsitivity, refers to abnormally decreased sensitivity to sensory input.

Hyposensitivity is a symptom of sensory processing disorder, and is most commonly seen in autistic (or ADHD) people. Those experiencing hyposensitivity have a harder time stimulating their senses than normally. They may not feel pain as easily as others, may be drawn to loud noises, be attracted to bright lights and colours, among other things.

Hyposensitivity can lead to concentration problems, feeling drained, depression, procrastination and also hypersensitivities.

== Types of hyposensitivity ==
Auditory hyposensitivity symptoms include:

- Little or no vocalizing/babbling as an infant.
- Speaking in a loud voice and/or excessively.
- Liking overly loud music, games, TV.
- Difficulty with verbal cues such as name being called.
- Difficulty remembering what was said, or needs instructions repeated.
- Talking self through task, often out loud.
- Appearing oblivious to certain sounds.
- Disorientation/confusion about where a sound is coming from.

Tactile hyposensitivity symptoms include:

- Craving touch. Needs to touch everything and everyone.
- Self-injurious behavior; pinching, biting, cutting, head-banging.
- Having a high pain tolerance.
- Often putting objects in their mouth.
- Seeking out surfaces and textures that provide strong tactile feedback.
- Failing to perceive being touched or bumped unless the contact is forceful.
- Failing to perceive that hands or face are dirty.

Olfactory hyposensitivity symptoms include:

- Failing to notice toxic odors.
- Often smelling objects, toys, people.

Taste hyposensitivity symptoms include:

- Eating or chewing on inedible items.
- Preferring food with intense flavour - excessively spicy, sweet, sour, or salty.
- Liking brushing teeth/vibrating toothbrushes.
- Enjoying more texturized foods like chips, crackers, or hard candy instead of soft foods like ice cream or soup.

Visual hyposensitivity symptoms include:

- Seeking visual input by staring at bright lights or moving objects.
- Getting tired easily while reading, writing, drawing, or playing video games.

Vestibular hyposensitivity symptoms include:

- Rocking back and forth or walking in circles while body rocking.
- Spinning or swinging for a long time without feeling dizzy or nauseated.
- Having trouble with balance.

Proprioceptive hyposensitivity symptoms include:

- Having limited spatial awareness and difficulty knowing where the body is in space.
- Bumping into objects and people, tendency to fall.
- Weak grasp and frequently dropping things.
- Leaning against people, furniture, or walls.

== See also ==
- Auditory processing disorder
- Autism
- Sensory processing disorder
- Stimming
