= Stapedius muscle =

Muscle in the human ear

Stapedius
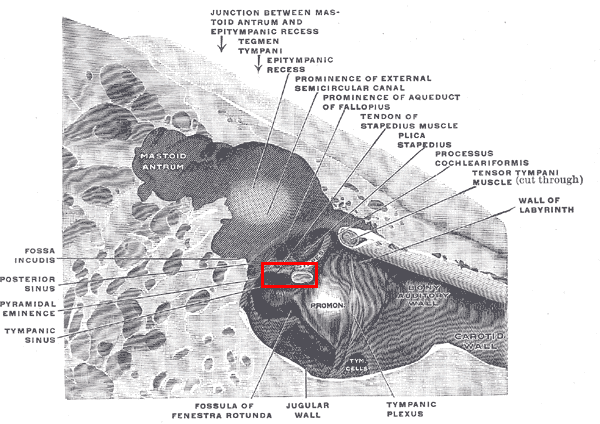
- The medial wall and part of the posterior and anterior walls of the right tympanic cavity, lateral view.

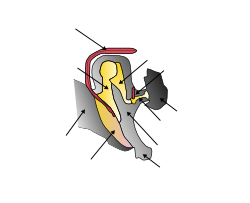
- Bones and muscles in the tympanic cavity in the middle ear

Details
- Origin: Walls of pyramidal eminence
- Insertion: Neck of stapes
- Artery: Stapedial branch of posterior auricular artery
- Nerve: Facial nerve (nerve to stapedius)
- Actions: Control the amplitude of sound waves to the inner ear

Identifiers
- Latin: musculus stapedius
- MeSH: D013198
- TA98: A15.3.02.062
- TA2: 2103
- FMA: 49027

The stapedius is the smallest skeletal muscle in the human body. At just over one millimeter in length, its purpose is to stabilize the smallest bone in the body, the stapes or stirrup bone of the middle ear.

== Structure ==
The stapedius emerges from a pinpoint foramen or opening in the apex of the pyramidal eminence (a hollow, cone-shaped prominence in the posterior wall of the tympanic cavity), and inserts into the neck of the stapes.

=== Nerve supply ===
The stapedius is supplied by the nerve to stapedius, a branch of the facial nerve.

== Function ==
The stapedius dampens the vibrations of the stapes by pulling on the neck of that bone. As one of the muscles involved in the acoustic reflex it prevents excess movement of the stapes, helping to control the amplitude of sound waves from the general external environment to the inner ear.

== Clinical significance ==
Paralysis of the stapedius allows wider oscillation of the stapes, resulting in heightened reaction of the auditory ossicles to sound vibration. This condition, known as hyperacusis, causes normal sounds to be perceived as very loud. Paralysis of the stapedius muscle may result when the nerve to the stapedius, a branch of the facial nerve, is damaged, or when the facial nerve itself is damaged before the nerve to stapedius branches. In cases of Bell's palsy, a unilateral paralysis of the facial nerve, the stapedius is paralyzed and hyperacusis may result.

Involuntary movement of the muscle causes Middle Ear Myoclonus.

== Other animals ==
Like the stapes bone to which it attaches, the stapedius muscle shares evolutionary history with other vertebrate structures.

The mammalian stapedius evolved from a muscle called the depressor mandibulae in other tetrapods, the function of which was to open the jaws (this function was taken over by the digastric muscle in mammals). The depressor mandibulae arose from the levator operculi in bony fish, and is equivalent to the epihyoidean in sharks. Like the stapedius, all of these muscles derive from the hyoid arch and are innervated by cranial nerve VII.

== See also ==
- Hearing
- Middle ear
- Ossicles
- Tensor tympani – the other major muscle in the middle ear
- Stapes – the other bone to which the muscle attaches
