= Acoustic shock =

Negative symptoms in response to loud noise

Acoustic shock is the set of symptoms a person may experience after hearing an unexpected, loud sound. The loud sound, called an acoustic incident, can be caused by feedback oscillation, fax tones, or signalling tones. Telemarketers and call centre employees are thought to be most at risk.

== Reported symptoms ==
During the exposure, most people experience discomfort and pain. After the exposure, some people might report shock, nausea and anxiety or depression. Headache, fatigue, hypersensitivity to loud noise and tinnitus may continue for days, weeks or indefinitely. It has not been established how such unrelated symptoms might be caused by an acoustic exposure, or whether such symptoms are even a direct result of exposure. There is literature that suggests acoustic shock is not a pathological entity but predominantly psychogenic.

== Physiological mechanisms ==
It has been suggested that the tensor tympani is involved in causing the disorder (see tonic tensor tympani syndrome). In France, researchers report the study of a case of acoustic shock in a scientific publication. They suggest that these symptoms may result from a loop involving the middle ear muscles, peripheral inflammatory processes, activation and sensitization of the trigeminal nerve, the autonomic nervous system, and central feedbacks.

== Prevention ==
There are many methods of attempting to reduce the risk of AS. Several devices attempt to remove potentially harmful sound signals by digital signal processing. None has yet been shown to be fully effective. Devices which solely limit noise levels to about 85 dB have been shown in field trials to be ineffective (data from these trials has not been released into the public domain). Limiting background noise and office stress may also reduce the chance of an acoustic shock. Proper use of the headset and preventing mobile phones from being used in call centers reduces the chance of feedback.

== Legal action ==
84 BT employees with depression, headaches and other health problems demanded compensation for injury sustained from acoustic shock at work. BT has already paid £90,000 to one worker who had tinnitus.

In March 2018, a musician won a claim for damages against the British Royal Opera House for acoustic shock caused by excessive noise during orchestral rehearsals.
