= Acoustic reflex =

Muscle contraction in the middle ear in response to loud sound

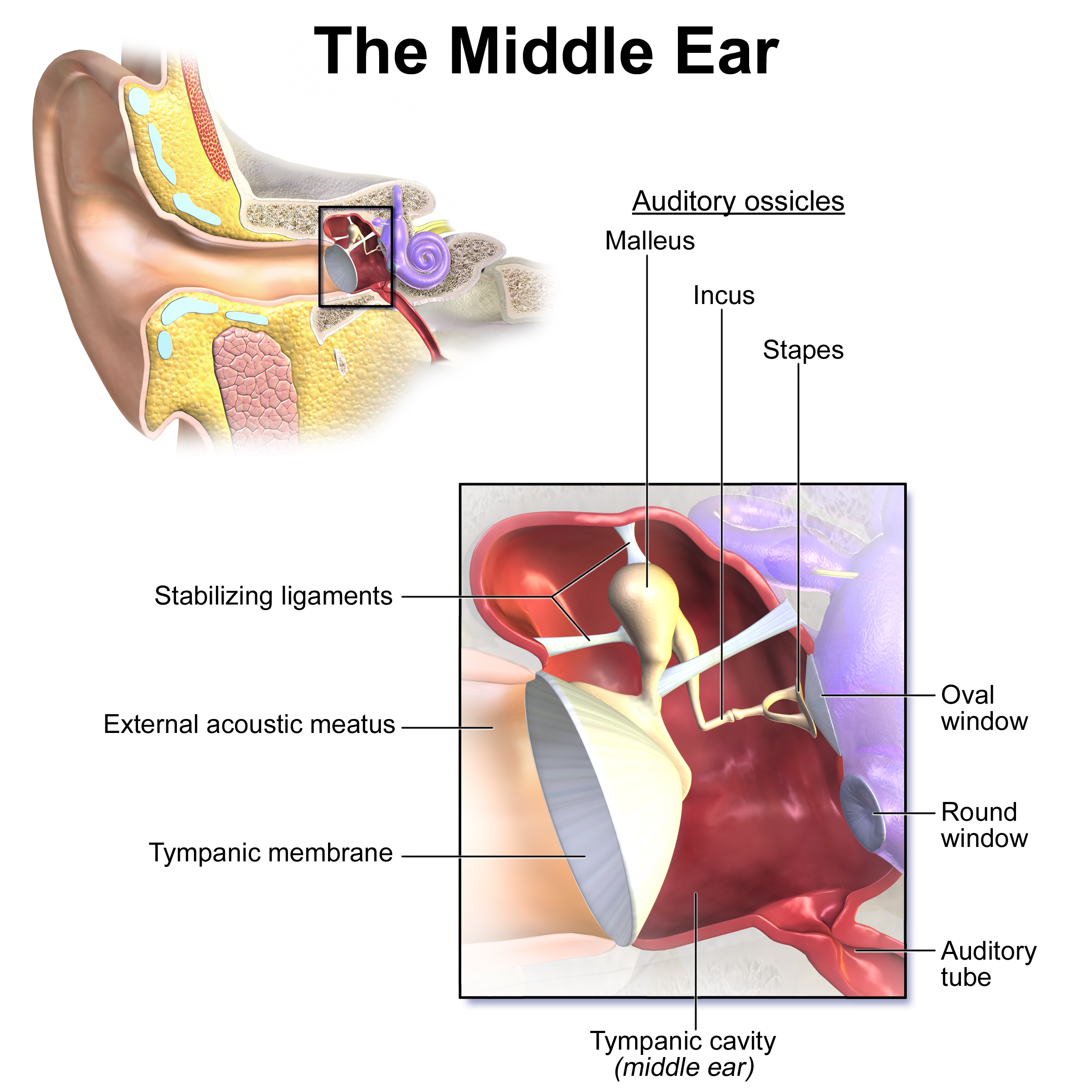

Identifiers
- MeSH: D012022

The acoustic reflex (also known as the stapedius reflex, stapedial reflex, auditory reflex, middle-ear-muscle reflex (MEM reflex, MEMR), attenuation reflex, cochleostapedial reflex or intra-aural reflex) is an involuntary muscle contraction that occurs in the middle ear in response to loud sound stimuli or when the person starts to vocalize.

When presented with an intense sound stimulus, the stapedius and tensor tympani muscles of the ossicles contract. The stapedius stiffens the ossicular chain by pulling the stapes (stirrup) of the middle ear away from the oval window of the cochlea and the tensor tympani muscle stiffens the ossicular chain by loading the tympanic membrane when it pulls the malleus (hammer) in toward the middle ear. The reflex decreases the transmission of vibrational energy to the cochlea, where it is converted into electrical impulses to be processed by the brain.

== Acoustic reflex threshold ==
The acoustic reflex threshold (ART) is the sound pressure level (SPL) from which a sound stimulus with a given frequency will trigger the acoustic reflex. The ART is a function of sound pressure level and frequency.

People with normal hearing have an acoustic reflex threshold (ART) around 70–100 dB SPL. People with conductive hearing loss (i.e., bad transmission in the middle ear) may have a greater or absent acoustic reflex threshold.

The acoustic reflex threshold is usually 10–20 dB below the discomfort threshold. However the discomfort threshold is not a relevant indicator of the harmfulness of a sound: industry workers tend to have a higher discomfort threshold, but the sound is just as harmful to their ears.

The acoustic reflex threshold can be decreased by the simultaneous presentation of a second tone (facilitator). The facilitator tone can be presented to either ear. This facilitation effect tends to be greater when the facilitator tone has a frequency lower than the frequency of the elicitor (i.e. the sound used to trigger the acoustic reflex).

== Characteristics and effects ==
- For most animals, the acoustic reflex is the contraction of both middle ear muscles: the stapedius and tensor tympani muscles. However, in humans, the acoustic reflex only involves the contraction of the stapedius muscle, not the tensor tympani.
- The contraction of the stapedius muscle occurs bilaterally in normal ears, no matter which ear was exposed to the loud sound stimulation.
- The prevalence of bilateral acoustic reflexes in persons 18–30 years old is 85.3% (82.9%, 87.4%) 95th percentile confidence interval N = 3280 and in all persons 74.6% (73.2%, 75.9%) N = 15,106.
- The acoustic reflex mostly protects against low frequency sounds.
- When triggered by sounds 20 dB above the reflex threshold, the stapedius reflex decreases the intensity of the sound transmitted to the cochlea by around 15 dB.
- The acoustic reflex is also invoked when a person vocalizes. In humans, the vocalization-induced stapedius reflex reduces sound intensities reaching the inner ear by approximately 20 decibels. The reflex is triggered in anticipation of the onset of vocalization. While the vocalization-induced stapedius reflex in humans results in an approximate 20 dB reduction in transduction to the inner ear, birds have a stronger stapedius reflex that is invoked just before the bird tweets.

== Hypothesized function ==
The main hypothesized function of the acoustic reflex is the protection of the organ of Corti against excessive stimulation (especially that of the lower frequencies). This protection has been demonstrated both in humans and animals, but with limited effects.

According to the article Significance of the stapedius reflex for the understanding of speech, the latency of contraction is only about 10ms, but maximum tension may not be reached for 100 ms or more. According to the article Le traumatisme acoustique, the latency of contraction is 150 ms with noise stimulus which SPL is at the threshold (ATR), and 25–35 ms at high sound pressure levels. Indeed, the amplitude of the contraction grows with the sound pressure level stimulus.

Because of this latency, the acoustic reflex cannot protect against sudden intense noises. However, when several sudden intense noises are presented at a pace higher than 2–3 seconds of interval, the acoustic reflex is able to play a role against auditory fatigue.

Moreover, the full tension of the stapedius muscle cannot be maintained in response to continued stimulation. Indeed, the tension drops to about 50% of its maximum value after a few seconds.

In damage risk criteria for exposure to impulse noise, the acoustic reflex is integral to the Auditory Hazard Assessment Algorithm for Humans model and the Integrated Cochlear Energy models. These two models estimate the response of the basilar membrane in response to an input stimulus and summate the vibration of the segments of the basilar membrane to predict the potential risk for hearing loss. The acoustic reflex can be activated before an impulse reaches the ear through an assumed conditioned response or it can be activated after the stimulus exceeds a specific level (e.g. 134 dB).

Recent measurements of the acoustic reflex with a group of 50 subjects found that only 2 of the subjects exhibited any pre-activation of the reflex in the warned (countdown) or volitional control of the eliciting stimulus.

An alternative hypothesis for the role of the acoustic reflex is the prevention of auditory masking of high-frequencies by low-frequencies, which are predominant in natural sounds.

== Measurement ==
Most of the time, the stapedius reflex is tested with tympanometry. The contraction of the stapedius muscle stiffens the middle-ear, thus decreasing middle-ear admittance; this can be measured thanks to tympanometry. The acoustic stapedius reflex can also be recorded by means of extratympanic manometry (ETM).

The stapedial reflex can be measured with laser Doppler velocimetry. Jones et al. focused a laser on the light reflex of the manubrium in awake human subjects. The amplitude of a 500 Hz probe tone was used to monitor the vibrations of the tympanic membrane. Various elicitors were presented to the subjects: 1000 Hz tone-burst for 0.5 s at 100 dB SPL, recorded .22 caliber gunshot noise with a peak level of 110 dB SPL. The amplitude of the 500 Hz probe tone was reduced in response to the eliciting stimuli. Time constants for the rate of onset and recovery were measured to be about 113 ms for the tone and 60-69 ms for the gunshot recordings.

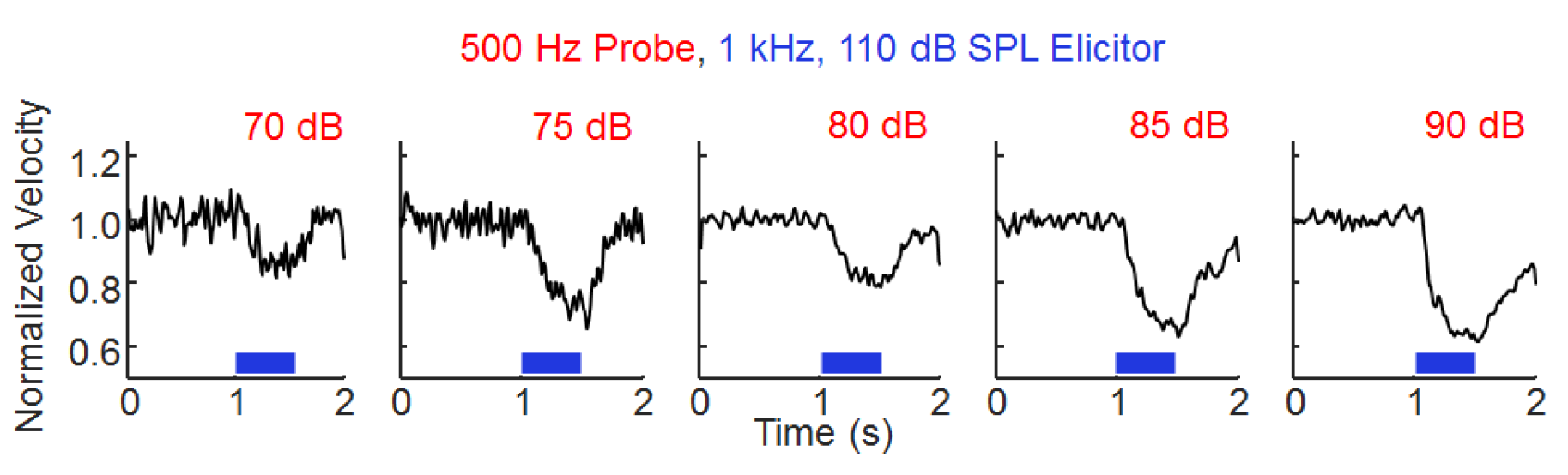
Examples of the onset and recovery of the acoustic reflex measured with a laser Doppler velocimetry system.

As the stapedius muscle is innervated by the facial nerve, a measurement of the reflex can be used to locate the injury on the nerve. If the injury is distal to the stapedius muscle, the reflex is still functional.

A measurement of the reflex can also be used to suggest a retrocochlear lesion (e.g., vestibular schwannoma).

The acoustic reflex normally occurs only at relatively high intensities; contraction of middle ear muscles for quieter sounds can indicate ear dysfunction (e.g. tonic tensor tympani syndrome -TTTS).

The pathway involved in the acoustic reflex is complex and can involve the ossicular chain (malleus, incus and stapes), the cochlea (organ of hearing), the auditory nerve, brain stem, facial nerve, superior olivary complex, and cochlear nucleus. Consequently, the absence of an acoustic reflex, by itself, may not be conclusive in identifying the source of the problem.

== See also ==
- Tensor tympani
- Otoacoustic emission
- Equal-loudness contours
- Audiometry
- Hyperacusis
- Stapedius muscle
- Tympanometry
