= Tinnitus =

False perception of sound

- Pronunciation: /ˈtɪnɪtəs/ or /tɪˈnaɪtəs/
- Specialty: Otorhinolaryngology, audiology, neurology
- Symptoms: Hearing sound when no external sound is present
- Complications: Poor concentration, anxiety, depression
- Usual onset: Gradual
- Causes: Noise-induced hearing loss, ear infections, disease of the heart or blood vessels, Ménière's disease, brain tumors, vestibular schwannoma, cholesteatoma, traumatic brain injury, excessive earwax
- Diagnostic method: Based on symptoms, audiogram, neurological exam
- Treatment: Counseling, sound generators, hearing aids
- Frequency: ~12.5%

Tinnitus is a condition when a person hears a ringing sound or a different variety of sounds when no corresponding external sound is present and that other people cannot hear. The word tinnitus comes from the Latin tinnire, "to ring".

Tinnitus may be associated with hearing loss or decreased comprehension of speech in noisy environments. It is common, affecting about 10–15% of people. Most tolerate it well, and it is a significant (severe) problem in only 1–2% of people.

Rather than a disease, tinnitus is a symptom that may result from a variety of underlying causes and may be generated at any level of the auditory system as well as outside that system. The most common causes are hearing damage, noise-induced hearing loss, or age-related hearing loss, known as presbycusis. Other causes include ear infections, disease of the heart or blood vessels, Ménière's disease, brain tumors, acoustic neuromas (tumors on the auditory nerves of the ear), migraines, temporomandibular joint disorders, exposure to certain medications, a previous head injury, and earwax. In some people, it interferes with concentration, and can be associated with anxiety and depression. It can suddenly emerge or increase during a period of emotional stress. It may have a higher incidence in people with depression.

The diagnosis of tinnitus is usually based on a person's description of the symptoms they are experiencing. Such a diagnosis is commonly supported by an audiogram, and an otolaryngological and neurological examination. How much tinnitus interferes with a person's life may be quantified with questionnaires. If certain problems are found, medical imaging, such as magnetic resonance imaging (MRI), may be performed. Other tests are suitable when tinnitus occurs with the same rhythm as the heartbeat. Rarely, the sound may be heard by someone other than the person affected by using a stethoscope, in which case it is known as "objective tinnitus". Occasionally, spontaneous otoacoustic emissions, sounds produced normally by the inner ear, may result in tinnitus.

Measures to prevent tinnitus include avoiding chronic or extended exposure to loud noise, and limiting exposure to drugs and substances harmful to the ear (ototoxic). If there is an underlying cause, treating that cause may lead to improvements. Otherwise, typically, tinnitus management involves psychoeducation or counseling, such as talk therapy. Sound generators or hearing aids may help, but there are no drugs to treat the condition.

== Signs and symptoms ==
Simulation of a tinnitus

Tinnitus is often described as ringing, but it may also sound like clicking, buzzing, hissing, or roaring. It may be soft or loud, low- or high-pitched, and may seem to come from either one or both ears, or from other parts of the head. It may be intermittent or continuous. In some individuals, its intensity may be changed by shoulder, neck, head, tongue, jaw, or eye movements.

=== Course ===
Due to variations in study designs, data on the course of tinnitus shows few consistent results. Generally, prevalence increases with age in adults, and the ratings of annoyance increase with persistence at follow up.

=== Adverse psychological effects ===
Although it is an annoying condition to which most people adapt, persistent tinnitus may cause anxiety and depression in some people. Tinnitus annoyance is more strongly associated with the psychological condition of the person than the loudness or frequency range of the perceived sound. Psychological problems such as depression, anxiety, sleep disturbances, and concentration difficulties are common in those with strongly annoying tinnitus. One study found that complications can also include cognitive decline and difficulty communicating, and 45% of people with tinnitus in that study had an anxiety disorder at some time in their lives. Severe cases may lead some to consider suicide; while suicidal behavior is complex, tinnitus can be a risk factor. In a cross-sectional analysis, 15.75% of the 292 patients that attended a 2019 Tinnitus and Hyperacusis Clinic in the United Kingdom "expressed that they have been bothered by suicidal and self-harm ideations within the last 2 weeks."

Psychological research has focused on the tinnitus distress reaction to account for differences in tinnitus severity. The research indicates that among the cohort studied, conditioning at the initial perception of tinnitus linked it with negative emotions, such as fear and anxiety.

== Types ==
Commonly tinnitus is classified into "subjective and objective tinnitus". Tinnitus is usually subjective, meaning that the sounds the person hears are not detectable by means currently available to physicians and hearing technicians. Subjective tinnitus has also been called "tinnitus aurium", "non-auditory", or "non-vibratory" tinnitus.

In rare cases, tinnitus may be heard by someone else using a stethoscope. Even more rarely, in some cases it may be measured as a spontaneous otoacoustic emission (SOAE) in the ear canal. This is classified as "objective tinnitus", also called "pseudo-tinnitus" or "vibratory" tinnitus.

=== Subjective tinnitus ===
Subjective tinnitus is the most frequent type. It may have many causes, but most commonly it results from hearing loss. When it is caused by disorders of the inner ear or auditory nerve, it can be called "otic" (from the Greek word for ear). These otological or neurological disorders include those triggered by infections, drugs, or trauma. A cause is traumatic noise exposure that damages the sensory cilia, or hair cells, in the inner ear. Some evidence suggests that long-term exposure to noise pollution from heavy traffic may increase the risk of developing tinnitus.

When there does not seem to be a connection with a disorder of the inner ear or auditory nerve, tinnitus may be called "non-otic". In 30% of cases, tinnitus is influenced by the somatosensory system; for instance, people can increase or decrease their tinnitus by moving their face, head, jaw, or neck. This type is called somatic or craniocervical tinnitus, since it is only head or neck movements that have the effect.

Some tinnitus may be caused by neuroplastic changes in the central auditory pathway. In this theory, the disturbance of sensory input caused by hearing loss results in such changes, as a homeostatic response of neurons in the central auditory system, causing tinnitus.

When some frequencies of sound are lost to hearing loss, the auditory system compensates by amplifying those frequencies, eventually producing sound sensations at those frequencies constantly, even when there is no corresponding external sound.

==== Hearing loss ====
The most common cause of tinnitus is hearing loss. Hearing loss may have many different causes, but among those with tinnitus, the major cause is cochlear injury.

In many cases, no underlying cause is identified.

Ototoxic drugs also may cause subjective tinnitus, as they may cause hearing loss, or increase the damage done by exposure to loud noise. This damage may occur even at doses not considered ototoxic. More than 260 medications have been reported to cause tinnitus as a side effect.

Tinnitus may also occur from the discontinuation of therapeutic doses of benzodiazepines. It may sometimes be a protracted symptom of benzodiazepine withdrawal and may persist for many months. Medications such as bupropion may also cause tinnitus.

==== Associated factors ====
Factors associated with tinnitus include:

- Ear problems and hearing loss:
  - Conductive hearing loss
    - Acoustic shock
    - Loud noise or music
    - Middle ear effusion
    - Otitis
    - Otosclerosis
    - Eustachian tube dysfunction
  - Sensorineural hearing loss
    - Excessive or loud noise; e.g. acoustic trauma
    - Presbycusis (age-associated hearing loss)
    - Ménière's disease
    - Endolymphatic hydrops
    - Superior canal dehiscence
    - Acoustic neuroma
    - Mercury or lead poisoning
    - Ototoxic medications
- Neurologic disorders:
  - Chiari malformation
  - Multiple sclerosis
  - Head injury
  - Giant cell arteritis
- Temporomandibular joint dysfunction
- Metabolic disorders:
  - Vitamin B_{12} deficiency
  - Iron deficiency anemia
- Psychiatric disorders
  - Depression
  - Anxiety disorders
- Other factors:
  - Vasculitis
  - Some psychedelic drugs can produce temporary tinnitus-like symptoms as a side effect:
    - 5-MeO-DET
    - Diisopropyltryptamine (DiPT)
  - Benzodiazepine withdrawal
  - Intracranial hyper or hypotension caused by, for example, encephalitis or a cerebrospinal fluid leak

=== Objective tinnitus ===
A specific type of tinnitus, objective tinnitus, is characterized by hearing the sounds of one's own muscle contractions or pulse, typically a result of sounds that have been created by the movement of jaw muscles or sounds related to blood flow in the neck or face. This type of tinnitus is sometimes caused by an involuntary twitching of a muscle or a group of muscles (myoclonus) or by a vascular condition. In some cases, tinnitus is generated by muscle spasms around the middle ear, a condition called middle ear myoclonus.

Spontaneous otoacoustic emissions (SOAEs)—faint high-frequency tones that are produced in the inner ear and may be measured in the ear canal with a sensitive microphone—may also cause tinnitus. About 8% of those with SOAEs and tinnitus have SOAE-linked tinnitus, while the percentage of all cases of tinnitus caused by SOAEs is estimated at 4%.

=== Pediatric tinnitus ===
Children may be subject to pulsatile or continuous tinnitus, involving anomalies and variants of the vascular parts affecting the middle/inner ear structures. CT scans may be used to check the integrity of the structures, and MR scans may evaluate nerves and potential masses or malformations. Early diagnosis may prevent long-term impairments to development.

=== Pulsatile tinnitus ===
Some people experience a sound that beats in time with their pulse, known as pulsatile tinnitus or vascular tinnitus. Pulsatile tinnitus is usually objective in nature, resulting from altered blood flow or increased blood turbulence near the ear, such as from atherosclerosis or venous hum, but it may also arise as a subjective phenomenon from an increased awareness of blood flow in the ear.

The differential diagnosis for pulsatile tinnitus is wide and includes vascular etiologies, tumors, disorders of the middle ear or inner ear, and other intracranial pathologies. Vascular causes of pulsatile tinnitus include venous causes (e.g., high riding or dehiscent jugular bulb, sigmoid sinus diverticulum), arterial causes (e.g., cervical atherosclerosis, potentially life-threatening conditions such as carotid artery aneurysm or carotid artery dissection), or dural arteriovenous fistula or arteriovenous malformations.

Pulsatile tinnitus may also indicate vasculitis, or more specifically, giant cell arteritis. Pulsatile tinnitus may also be caused by tumors such as paragangliomas (e.g., glomus jugulare), or hemangiomas (e.g., facial nerve or cavernous). Middle ear causes of pulsatile tinnitus include patulous eustachian tube, otosclerosis, or middle ear myoclonus (e.g., stapedial or tensor tympani myoclonus). The most common inner ear cause of pulsatile tinnitus is superior semicircular canal dehiscence. Pulsatile tinnitus may also indicate idiopathic intracranial hypertension. Pulsatile tinnitus may be a symptom of intracranial vascular abnormalities and should be evaluated for irregular noises of blood flow (bruits).

== Pathophysiology ==
Tinnitus may be caused by increased neural activity in the auditory brainstem, where the brain processes sounds, causing some auditory nerve cells to become overexcited. The basis of this theory is that many with tinnitus also have hearing loss.

Three reviews in 2016 emphasized the large range and possible combinations of pathologies involved in tinnitus, which result in a great variety of symptoms and specifically adapted therapies.

== Diagnosis ==
The diagnostic approach is based on a history of the condition and an examination of the head, neck, and neurological system. Typically an audiogram is conducted, and occasionally medical imaging or electronystagmography. Treatable conditions may include middle ear infection, acoustic neuroma, concussion, and otosclerosis.

Evaluation of tinnitus may include a hearing test (audiogram), measurement of acoustic parameters of the tinnitus such as pitch and loudness, and psychological assessment of comorbid conditions such as depression, anxiety, and stress that might be associated with severity of the tinnitus.

One definition of tinnitus, in contrast to normal ear noise experience, is that tinnitus lasts five minutes at least twice a week. However, people with tinnitus often experience the noise more frequently than this. Tinnitus may be present constantly or intermittently. Some people with constant tinnitus might not be aware of it all the time, but only, for example, during the night or in situations when there is less environmental noise to mask it. Chronic tinnitus may be defined as tinnitus with a duration of six months or more.

=== Audiology ===
Since most people with tinnitus also have hearing loss, a pure tone hearing test resulting in an audiogram may help diagnose a cause. An audiogram may also facilitate fitting of a hearing aid in those cases where hearing loss is significant. The pitch of tinnitus is often in the range of the hearing loss.

=== Psychoacoustics ===
Acoustic qualification of tinnitus includes measurement of several acoustic parameters such as frequency in cases of monotone tinnitus or frequency range and bandwidth in cases of narrow band noise tinnitus, loudness in dB above hearing threshold at the indicated frequency, mixing-point, and minimum masking level. In most cases, tinnitus predominant pitch is between 13 kHz and 14 kHz, and loudness between 5 and 15 dB above the hearing threshold.

Another relevant parameter of tinnitus is residual inhibition: the temporary suppression or disappearance of tinnitus following a period of masking. The degree of residual inhibition may indicate how effective tinnitus maskers would be as treatment.

=== Hyperacusis ===
An assessment of hyperacusis, a frequent accompaniment of tinnitus, may also be made.

Hyperacusis is related to negative reactions to sound and may take many forms. One parameter that may be measured is Loudness Discomfort Level (LDL) in dB, which is the subjective level of acute discomfort at specified frequencies over the frequency range of hearing. This defines a dynamic range between the hearing threshold at that frequency and the loudness discomfort level. A compressed dynamic range over a particular frequency range may be associated with hyperacusis. The normal hearing comfort threshold is generally defined as 0–20 decibels (dB). Normal loudness discomfort levels are 85–90+ dB, with some authorities citing 100 dB. A dynamic range of 55 dB or lower is indicative of hyperacusis.

=== Severity ===
Tinnitus is often rated on a scale from "slight" to "severe" according to the effects it has, such as interference with sleep, quiet activities, and normal daily activities. Severe tinnitus has been associated with rarer variants.

Assessment of psychological processes related to tinnitus involves measurement of tinnitus severity and distress, as measured subjectively by validated self-report tinnitus questionnaires. Such questionnaires measure the degree of psychological distress and handicap associated with tinnitus, including effects on hearing, lifestyle, health, and emotional functioning. A broader assessment of general functioning, such as levels of anxiety, depression, stress, life stressors, and sleep difficulties, is also important in the assessment of tinnitus due to higher risk of negative well-being across these areas, which may be affected by or exacerbate the tinnitus symptoms.

Current assessment measures aim to identify levels of distress and interference, coping responses, and perceptions of tinnitus to inform treatment and monitor progress. However, wide variability, inconsistencies, and lack of consensus regarding assessment methodology are evidenced in the literature, limiting comparison of treatment effectiveness. Questionnaires developed to guide diagnosis or classify severity of tinnitus may be treatment-sensitive outcome measures.

=== Pulsatile tinnitus ===
If examination reveals a bruit (sound due to turbulent blood flow), imaging studies such as transcranial doppler (TCD) or magnetic resonance angiography (MRA) should be performed.

=== Differential diagnosis ===
Other potential sources of the sounds normally associated with tinnitus should be ruled out. For instance, two recognized external sources of high-pitched sounds might be electromagnetic fields common in modern wiring and various sound signal transmissions. A common and often misdiagnosed condition that mimics tinnitus is radio frequency (RF) hearing, in which subjects hear objectively audible high-pitched transmission frequencies that sound similar to tinnitus.

== Prevention ==
Safety sign from UK Government Regulations requiring ear protection

Prolonged exposure to loud sound or noise levels can lead to tinnitus. Custom made ear plugs or other measures may help with prevention. Employers may use hearing loss prevention programs to help educate and prevent dangerous levels of exposure to noise. Government organizations set regulations to ensure employees, if following the protocol, should have minimal risk to permanent damage to their hearing.

Certain groups are advised to wear ear plugs to avoid the risk of tinnitus, such as that caused by overexposure to loud noises such as wind noise for motorcycle riders. This includes military personnel, musicians, DJs, agricultural workers, and construction workers as people in those occupations are at a greater risk compared to the general population.

Several medicines have ototoxic effects, which can have a cumulative effect that increases the damage resulting from loud noise. If ototoxic medications must be administered, close attention by the physician to prescription details, such as dose and dosage interval, may reduce the amount of damage.

== Management ==
If a specific underlying cause is determined, treating it may lead to improvements. Otherwise, the primary treatment for tinnitus is talk therapy, sound therapy, or hearing aids. There are no effective drugs that treat tinnitus.

=== Psychological ===
The best-supported treatment for adapting to high stress that might be associated with tinnitus is cognitive behavioral therapy (CBT). It decreases the stress those with tinnitus feel. This appears to be independent of any effect on depression or anxiety. Acceptance and commitment therapy (ACT) also shows promise in the treatment of tinnitus. Relaxation techniques may also help. A clinical protocol called Progressive Tinnitus Management has been developed by the United States Department of Veterans Affairs.

=== Sound-based interventions ===
The application of sound therapy by either hearing aids or tinnitus maskers may help the brain ignore the specific tinnitus frequency. Although these methods are poorly supported by evidence, there are no negative effects. There are several approaches for tinnitus sound therapy. The first is sound modification to compensate for the individual's hearing loss. The second is tailored music therapy, notched at the tinnitus frequency, which may affect lateral inhibition of the notched neural region, suppressing tinnitus; Tinnitracks is an example.

There is some tentative evidence supporting tinnitus retraining therapy, which aims to reduce tinnitus-related neuronal activity. An alternative tinnitus treatment uses mobile applications that include various methods including masking, sound therapy, and relaxation exercises. Such applications can work as a separate device or as a hearing aid control system.

Neuromonics is another sound-based intervention. Its protocol follows the principle of systematic desensitization and involves a structured rehabilitation program lasting 12 months. Neuromonics therapy employs customized sound signals delivered through a device worn by the patient, which aims to target the specific frequency range associated with their tinnitus perception.

=== Physical therapy ===
Physical therapy for tinnitus focuses on relaxing jaw and neck muscles that may contribute to symptoms. Muscle tension, particularly in the jaw muscles such as the masseter and medial pterygoid, may radiate to the ears, leading to somatic tinnitus. Specialized physical therapists use neuromuscular techniques to alleviate tension in these areas, which may reduce tinnitus intensity and the associated pain in connected areas, such as the jaw, teeth, and ears.

=== Medications ===
As of 2018 there were no medications effective for idiopathic tinnitus. There is not enough evidence to determine whether antidepressants or acamprosate are useful to treat tinnitus. There are conflicting studies regarding the effectiveness of benzodiazepines for tinnitus. As of 2015, the usefulness of melatonin was unclear. A 2024 meta-analysis of six small studies (176 patients) found that it may improve tinnitus-related disability and quality of life. It is unclear whether anticonvulsants are useful for treating tinnitus. Steroid injections into the middle ear also do not seem to be effective. There is no evidence to suggest that the use of betahistine to treat tinnitus is effective.

Botulinum toxin injection has succeeded in some of the rare cases of objective tinnitus resulting from a palatal tremor.

In 2009, use in a few countries of caroverine to treat tinnitus was published. Upon review, the evidence for its usefulness was very weak.

=== Neuromodulation ===
In 2020, information was reported about clinical trials indicating that bimodal neuromodulation may reduce the symptoms of tinnitus. It is a noninvasive technique that involves applying an electrical stimulus to the tongue while also administering sounds.

The Lenire bimodal neuromodulation device marketed by Neuromod was approved as a treatment option for tinnitus in March 2023 by the United States Food and Drug Administration (FDA). In June 2024, the United States Department of Veterans Affairs (VA) announced it would begin offering the treatment to veterans with tinnitus, making it the first bimodal neuromodulation device to be awarded a Federal Supply Schedule (FSS) contract from the U.S. Government.

Some evidence supports neuromodulation techniques such as transcranial magnetic stimulation, transcranial direct current stimulation, and neurofeedback.

=== Nerve damage repair via neurotrophins ===
Research into treatments that may encourage the auditory nerve to repair itself through the use of neurotrophins is under way. Stéphane Maison, an auditory physiologist at Massachusetts Eye and Ear Infirmary, noted in 2023, "Our work reconciles the idea that tinnitus may be triggered by a loss of auditory nerve, including in people with normal hearing... We won't be able to cure tinnitus until we fully understand the mechanisms underlying its genesis. This work is a first step toward our ultimate goal of silencing tinnitus". The study follows studies that established that treatment with neurotrophins demonstrated encouragement for repair of the nerve in other mammals and the findings should lead to investigation of the potential for a treatment for tinnitus in humans.

=== Alternative medicines not effective ===
A 2013 report indicated that Ginkgo biloba does not appear to be effective as a treatment for tinnitus. The American Academy of Otolaryngology recommends against taking melatonin or zinc supplements to relieve symptoms of tinnitus, and reported in 2014 that evidence for the efficacy of many dietary supplements (such as lipoflavonoids, garlic, traditional Chinese/Korean herbal medicine, honeybee larvae, and various other vitamins and minerals, as well as homeopathic preparations) did not exist for tinnitus. A 2016 Cochrane Review also concluded that evidence was not sufficient to support taking zinc supplements to reduce symptoms associated with tinnitus.

== Prognosis ==
While there is no cure, over time most affected people adapt to living with tinnitus; for a minority, it remains a significant problem.

== Epidemiology ==
=== Adults ===
Tinnitus affects 10–15% of people. About a third of North Americans over age 55 experience it. Tinnitus affects one third of adults at some time in their lives, whereas 10–15% are disturbed enough to seek medical evaluation. In Europe, 70 million people are estimated to have tinnitus.

=== Children ===
Commonly thought of as typically affecting adults, tinnitus often is overlooked in children. Even though children do not express the condition or its effect on their lives, children with hearing loss have a high incidence of pediatric tinnitus. Children do not generally report tinnitus spontaneously and their complaints may not be taken seriously. Among children who do complain of tinnitus, there is an increased likelihood of associated otological or neurological pathology such as migraine, juvenile Meniere's disease, or chronic suppurative otitis media.

Its reported prevalence varies from 12 to 36% in children with normal hearing thresholds, and up to 66% in children with a hearing loss. Approximately 3–10% of children have been reported to be troubled by tinnitus.

== See also ==
- List of investigational tinnitus drugs
- Auditory hallucination – Perception of sound without auditory stimulus
- Health effects from noise – Health consequences of exposure to elevated sound levels
- Hearing protection
- Noise-induced hearing loss
- List of people with tinnitus
- List of unexplained sounds – List of unidentified or formerly unidentified sounds
- Phantom vibration syndrome – False belief of one's mobile phone vibrating or ringing
- Safe listening – Avoiding hearing damage from intentionally heard sounds
- Zwicker tone – Short-term auditory illusion
