= TRT (disambiguation) =

TRT is the Turkish Radio and Television Corporation, the Turkish national public broadcaster.

TRT or trt may also refer to:

== Businesses and organisations ==
- Thai Rak Thai, a Thai political party (1998–2007)
- Tidewater Regional Transit, United States (1973–1999)
- Tong Ren Tang, a Chinese pharmaceutical company (founded 1669)
- Tshiuetin Rail Transportation, Canada (opened 2005)

== Engineering ==
- Thermal response test, used to determine the thermal properties of the ground
- Transport relay translation, an intermediate device between two hosts
- Transition radiation tracker of the ATLAS experiment
- Total resolution time, used to complete a task

== Entertainment ==
- TRT: La Máquina de la Destrucción, a Mexican wrestling group
- Tamil Radio and Television (now Tamil Television Network), France
- Televisora Regional del Táchira, Venezuela
- Thessalian Radio Television, Greece

== Medicine ==
- Testosterone replacement therapy
- Tinnitus retraining therapy

== Other uses ==
- Tahoe Rim Trail, an American hiking trail encircling Lake Tahoe
- Turkey Time, a time zone
- Tunggare language (ISO 639-3 code: trt)
