= GHX =

GHX can refer to:

- West Guihua Road station, a train station in Hangzhou, Zhejiang province, China
- Guanghe County, a county in Linxia prefecture, Gansu province, China; see List of administrative divisions of Gansu
- GHX circuit, a type of geothermal heating or cooling machine
