= Direct exchange geothermal heat pump =

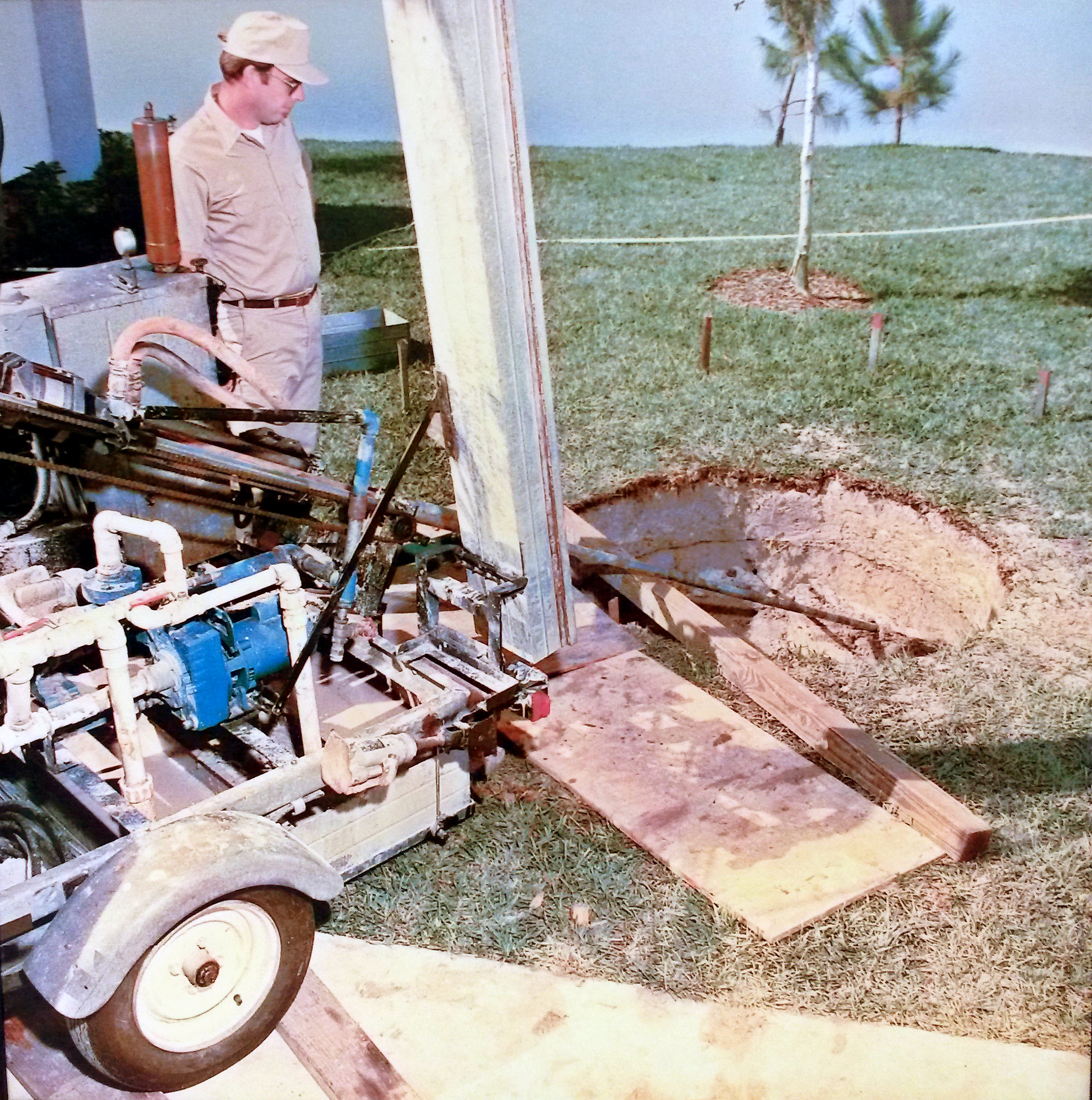
DX system being drilled in the 1980s

A direct exchange (DX) geothermal heat pump is a type of ground source heat pump in which refrigerant circulates through copper tubing placed in the ground unlike other ground source heat pumps where refrigerant is restricted to the heat pump itself with a secondary loop in the ground filled with a mixture of water and anti-freeze.

The simplicity of the DX designs is that high efficiencies can be reached using a shorter and smaller amount of buried tubing thereby reducing both the footprint and installation cost.

== Other appellations ==
The technology has many different others names and designations:

- Direct exchange geothermal heat pump
- DX
- Direct Geoexchange heat pumps – used by the Air-Conditioning, Heating, and Refrigeration Institute (AHRI) and is abbreviated DGX
- Direct-expansion ground source heat pumps – used by The American Society of Heating, Refrigerating, and Air-Conditioning Engineers (ASHRAE)
- Direct geothermal heat pumps
- Refrigerant-based geothermal systems
- Waterless Geothermal

== History ==
The first geothermal heat pump was a DX system built in the late 1940s by Robert C. Webber. It used Freon gas and buried copper tubing, for increased efficiency.

Later geothermal heat pumps designs started incorporating an additional plastic pipe loop to circulate water in deep wells in an effort to gather sufficient heat for large industrial applications, such as cement plants. Thus water-source technology advanced due to industrial interest while DX, more suited for residential and light commercial projects such as small businesses and private homes, lagged behind.

While the technology was expanding in the 80s and 90s, several of the early manufacturers faced issues with the refrigerant and oil management system. In the past, some DX geothermal manufactures designed their equipment similar to an ordinary heat pump being sold on the market today. Some of these older DX geothermal designs worked great while others experienced oil return issues.

In 2016 it was suggested only a minority of future systems would use DX technology.

== Operation principles ==
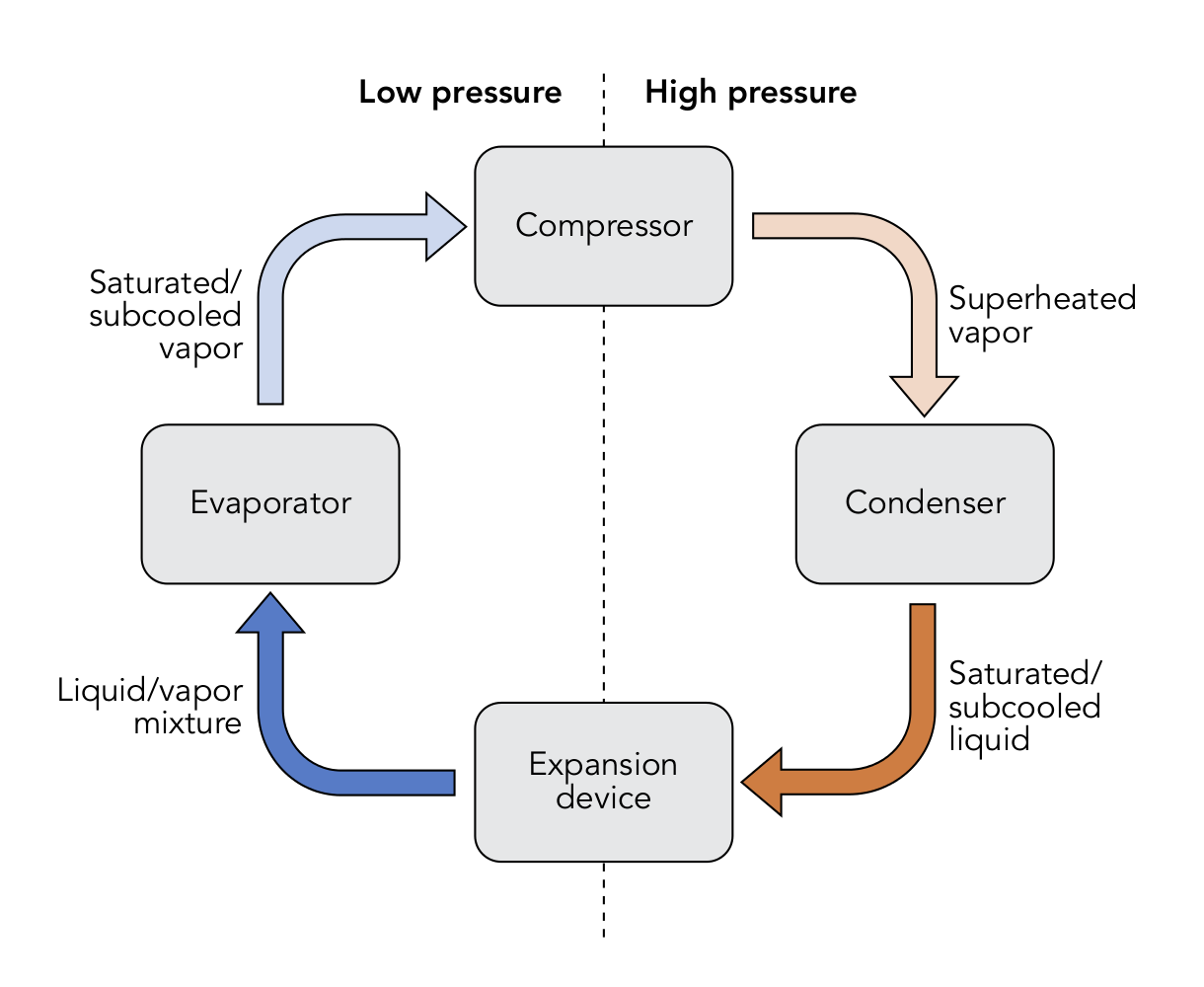
Vapor Compression Cycle in DX Geothermal

Direct exchange heat pumps are closed-loop geothermal systems which rely on (¼” to 1-1/8”) copper pipes to exchange heat with the earth. The copper pipes are placed in the ground and form a ground loop – sometimes also referred to as earth loop or refrigerant loop – where the circulating refrigerant undergoes phase transition by exchanging heat with the ground: in heating mode it absorbs heat and changes from liquid to gas (evaporation), while in cooling mode it gives heat off and changes from gas to liquid (condensing).

== Applications ==
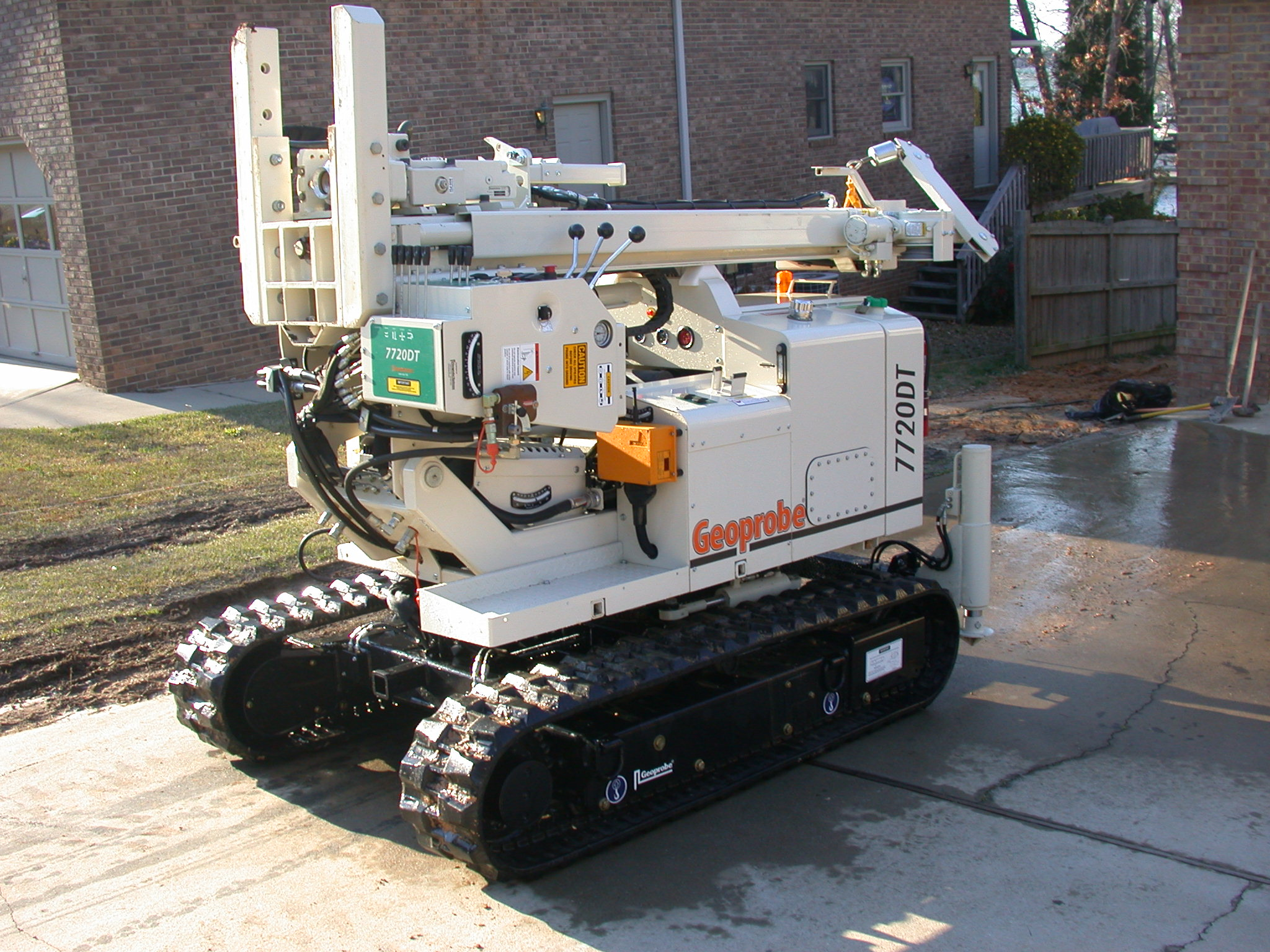
Typical drill rig for DX installation, length 8 ft

Typical drill rig for water source installation, length 22 ft

Direct exchange systems are rather simple refrigerant-based systems and operate without requiring anti-freezing agents, system flushing, circulating pump, water well drilling or plumbing. Direct exchange geothermal systems are the least invasive geothermal systems and feature small earth loop size. Because of that, they can be installed in relatively small areas and in relatively shallow soil – typical loop depth does not exceed 100 linear feet. The compactness of the earth loop systems, which require less drilling and smaller borehole, makes up for a simpler system that is cheaper and quicker to install.

== Use of copper ==
Direct exchange systems use copper because it is an excellent ground heat exchanger material and easy to manufacture. Copper tubing is strong and ductile; resistant to corrosion; has a very high thermal conductivity; and is available in many different diameters and in long coil lengths. Copper connections can be brazed, the tubing may be bent, and copper tubing is economically available.

In addition, copper has a long history of use in air conditioning and refrigeration, and is the material of choice for potable water for water lines buried underground and in buildings.

Copper has been used since antiquity in architectural constructions because it is a noble metal – one of a few that can be found naturally in the ground. This makes it a durable, weatherproof and corrosion-resistant material with an indefinite lifetime in most soils.

Although copper is extracted from the ground itself and is a noble metal – and is therefore almost completely impervious to corrosion from soils found worldwide – it might still undergo some corrosion in abnormally aggressive soils. It generally requires an oxidizing environment to start corrosion, and most soils are reducing, thus they contribute electrons to the copper and protect it against corrosion. In those areas where corrosive conditions may exist, copper will then naturally form a protective film on its surface which remains intact under most soil conditions.

In anticipation of particularly corrosive soils, DX systems come with a Cathodic Protection system. The principle is to protect the metal surface from corrosion by making it the cathode of an electrochemical cell. In that process, the metal –copper – is connected to a sacrificial metal which will corrode in its place. Corrosion of metals is an electrochemical process of deterioration that results from a loss of electrons as they react with water and/or oxygen. As the current flows from the Earth Loop Protection system, the metal surface to be protected is given in a uniform negative electrical potential that precludes corrosion of the ground loops, even in hostile environments.

== Ground loop configuration ==
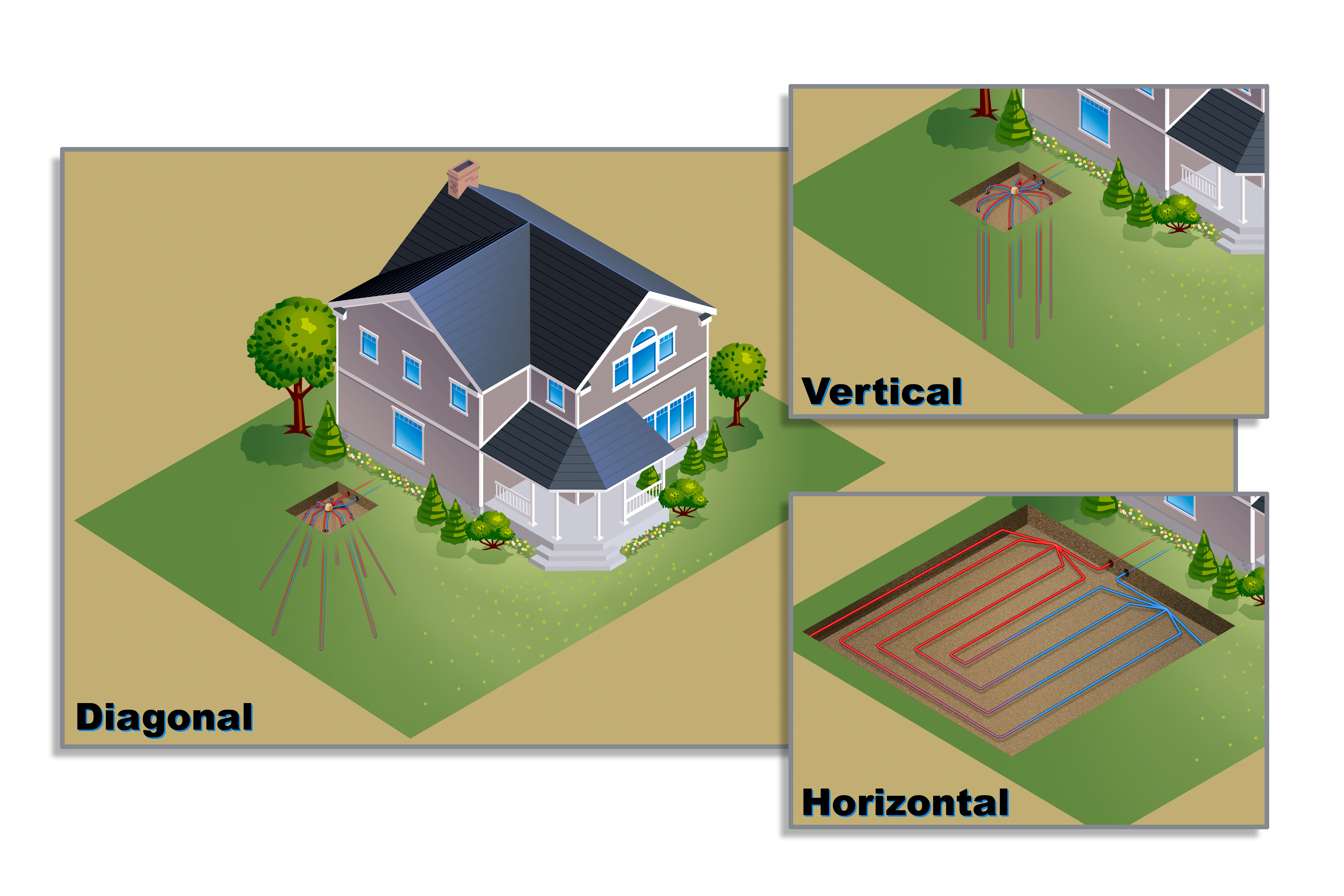
Three main ground loop configurations

The ground loop system may be installed in several different configurations. The three most common configurations are:

1. Vertical
2. Diagonal
3. Horizontal

Diagonal and Vertical configurations typically require drilling and grouting to be installed in drilled bore holes. Grout reseals the earth below the surface so that natural ground water aquifers are not interrupted. All diagonal and vertical systems must be grouted from the bottom up to the top.

Diagonal systems usually have a very small footprint.

Horizontal configurations usually only require trenching to be installed in excavated trenches or a pit. Horizontal systems do not usually require grout, except in the case of directional boring.

== System sizing ==
DX systems are currently manufactured in sizes from 2 tons (7.03KW) to 6 tons (21.10KW) . Larger projects can be accomplished through installation of multiple units.

== See also ==
- Deep water source cooling
- Geothermal heating and cooling
- Geothermal heat pump
- Ground-coupled heat exchanger
- Heat pumps
