= Eavor Technologies =

Geothermal technology company

Eavor Technologies Inc.
- Company type: Private
- Industry: Geothermal energy, Renewable energy technology
- Founded: 2017
- Headquarters: Calgary, Alberta, Canada
- Area served: Global
- Key people: John Redfern (president & CEO)
- Products: Eavor-Loop closed-loop geothermal system
- Services: Geothermal energy technology
- Website: eavor.com

Eavor Technologies Inc. (/ˈɛvər/ EV-ər) is a company headquartered in Calgary, Alberta. The firm was founded in 2017, and develops geothermal energy technology based on the closed loop principle.

== Activities ==
The Eavor-Lite Demonstration Project is a prototype closed-loop geothermal system located near Rocky Mountain House, Alberta. Construction began in August 2019 and was completed in February 2020.

In January 2020, Eavor announced a partnership with Carmacks Development Corporation (CDC), owned by the Little Salmon Carmacks First Nation, to build projects in Canada.

In May 2020, Eavor Technologies entered into a letter of intent to construct geothermal loops in Germany. The first loop of four loops began drilling in July 2023 and was expected to be completed in October 2024.

In May 2020, the firm announced further projects in locations across Canada, France, Norway and the United States. In 2022, Eavor announced plans for projects across Europe and North America.
