= Misophonia =

Disorder of decreased tolerance to specific sounds

- Other names: Selective sound sensitivity syndrome, misophonic disorder, select sound sensitivity syndrome, soft sound sensitivity symptom, sound-rage
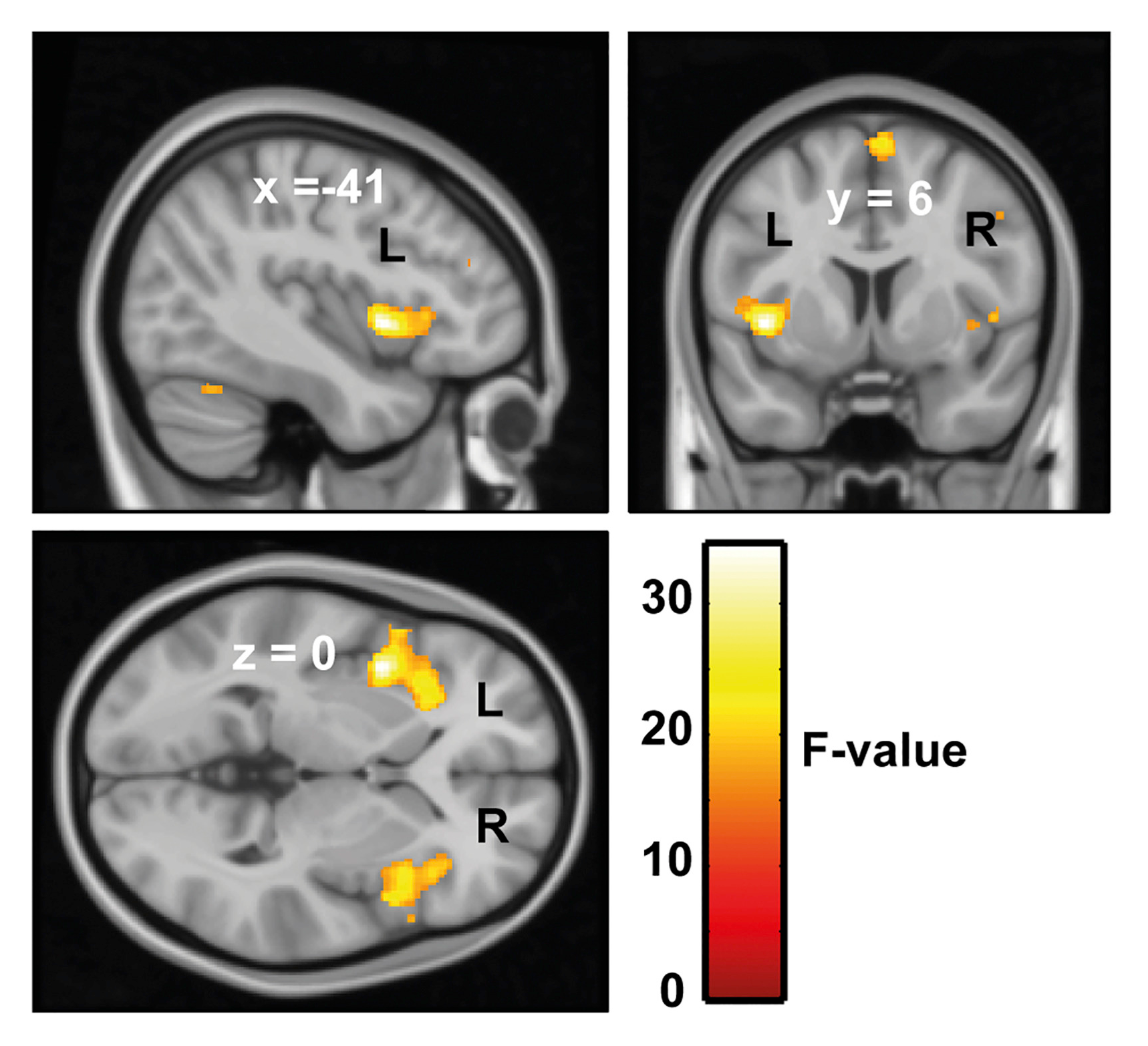
- Stronger brain responses to misophonia trigger sounds have been observed in people with misophonia.
- Pronunciation: /ˌmɪs.əˈfoʊ.ni.ə/
- Specialty: Psychiatry, clinical psychology, audiology
- Complications: Social isolation, extreme trigger avoidance, relationship difficulties, anxiety (particularly phonophobia), aggression, self-harm, suicidality
- Usual onset: Variable, with most common onset in childhood/early adolescence
- Causes: Neuropsychological and perceptual processing differences of unclear etiology
- Treatment: Cognitive behavioral therapy, tinnitus retraining therapy, medication

Misophonia, also known as selective sound sensitivity syndrome, is a disorder of decreased tolerance to specific sounds or their associated stimuli, or cues. These cues, known as "triggers", are experienced as unpleasant or distressing and tend to evoke negative emotional, physiological, and behavioral responses not seen in most other people. Behaviors used to cope, such as avoidance of "triggering" situations or using hearing protection, can affect the ability to achieve life goals, communicate effectively, and enjoy social situations. It is not listed as a condition in the DSM-5-TR, ICD-11, or similar manuals, making it difficult to receive an official diagnosis. In 2022, an international panel of experts published a consensus definition, (Note: The consensus definition was published in a 2022 paper titled "Consensus Definition of Misophonia: A Delphi Study". The paper's Results section contains a chapter headed "Consensus Definition of Misophonia," whose opening subsection, "General Description," gives the authors' formal definitional statement. The text states: "Misophonia is a disorder of decreased tolerance to specific sounds or stimuli associated with such sounds. These stimuli, known as "triggers," are experienced as unpleasant or distressing and tend to evoke strong negative emotional, physiological, and behavioral responses that are not seen in most other people. Misophonic responses do not seem to be elicited by the loudness of auditory stimuli, but rather by the specific pattern or meaning to an individual. Trigger stimuli are often repetitive and primarily, but not exclusively, include stimuli generated by another individual, especially those produced by the human body. Once a trigger stimulus is detected, individuals with misophonia may have difficulty distracting themselves from the stimulus and may experience suffering, distress, and/or impairment in social, occupational, or academic functioning. The expression of misophonic symptoms varies, as does the severity, which ranges from mild to severe impairments. Some individuals with misophonia are aware that their reactions to misophonic trigger stimuli are disproportionate to the circumstances. Misophonia symptoms are typically first observed in childhood or early adolescence.") which has been widely adopted.

When confronted with specific "trigger" stimuli, people with misophonia experience a range of negative emotions, most notably anger, extreme irritation, disgust, anxiety, and sometimes rage. The emotional response is often accompanied by a range of physical symptoms (e.g., muscle tension, increased heart rate, and sweating) that may reflect activation of the fight-or-flight response. Unlike the discomfort seen in hyperacusis, misophonic reactions do not seem to be elicited by the sound's loudness but rather by the trigger's specific pattern or meaning to the hearer. Many people cannot trigger themselves with self-produced sounds, or if such sounds do cause a reaction, it is substantially weaker than if another person produced the sound.

Reactions can be triggered by various auditory, visual, and audiovisual stimuli, most commonly mouth, nose, and throat sounds (particularly those produced by eating and drinking), repetitive sounds produced by other people or objects, and sounds produced by animals. The term misokinesia has been proposed to refer specifically to misophonic reactions to visual stimuli, often repetitive movements made by others. Once a trigger stimulus is detected, people with misophonia may have difficulty distracting themselves from the stimulus and may experience suffering, distress, or impairment in social, occupational, or academic functioning. Many people with misophonia are aware that their reactions to misophonic triggers are disproportionate to the circumstances, and their inability to regulate their responses to triggers can lead to shame, guilt, isolation, and self-hatred, as well as worsening hypervigilance about triggers, anxiety, and depression. Studies have shown that misophonia can cause problems in school, work, social life, and family. In the United States, misophonia is not considered one of the 13 disabilities recognized under the Individuals with Disabilities Education Act (IDEA) as eligible for an individualized education plan, but children with misophonia can be granted school-based disability accommodations under a 504 plan.

The expression of misophonia symptoms varies, as does their severity, which can range from mild and sub-clinical to severe and disabling. Rates vary widely across studies due to populations studied and methods used to determine whether a person meets diagnostic criteria. Three studies that used probability-based sampling methods estimated that 5–13% of adults may have clinically significant misophonia. Onset is generally in childhood or early adolescence, though the condition can begin at any age. Treatment primarily consists of specialized cognitive behavioral therapy, with limited evidence to support any one therapy modality or protocol over another and some studies demonstrating partial or full remission of symptoms with this or other treatment, such as psychotropic medication.

== Terminology ==
Pawel Jastreboff and Margaret M. Jastreboff coined the term misophonia in 2001 with the assistance of classical scholar Guy Lee, introducing it in their article "Hyperacusis", with further explanation in the International Tinnitus and Hyperacusis Society's ITHS Newsletter.

Misophonia comes from the Ancient Greek words μῖσος (IPA: /mîː.sos/), meaning "hate", and φωνή (IPA: /pʰɔː.nɛ̌ː/), meaning "voice" or "sound", loosely translating to "hate of sound", and was coined to differentiate the condition from other forms of decreased sound tolerance, such as hyperacusis (hypersensitivity to certain frequencies and volume ranges) and phonophobia (fear of sounds).

The term misophonia was first used in a peer-reviewed journal in 2002. Before that, the disorder was more commonly called selective sound sensitivity syndrome or 4S, a term coined by audiologist Marsha Johnson. Other names formerly used for the condition include soft sound sensitivity symptom, select sound sensitivity syndrome, decreased sound tolerance, and sound-rage.

Even after the term misophonia was coined, the condition remained largely undescribed in the clinical and research literature until 2013, when a group of psychiatrists at Amsterdam University Medical Center published a detailed misophonia case series and proposed the condition as a "new psychiatric disorder" with defined diagnostic criteria. In this series, Schröder and colleagues coined the term misokinesia (a term analogous to misophonia translating to "hatred of movement") to describe misophonia-like reactions that occur when people are "triggered" by specific repetitive visual stimuli, such as another person's foot shaking, fingers tapping, or gum chewing. Other authors have proposed Conditioned Aversive Response Disorder (CARD) as a more suitable name, which seeks to incorporate both the respective auditory and non-auditory aspects of misophonia and misokinesia into a single condition.

Adopting DSM-5-like terminology, some research groups have also advocated the name misophonic disorder to distinguish clinically significant and disabling misophonia from what they term misophonic reactions (i.e., sub-clinical manifestations of misophonia that do not cause marked distress or substantially impair a person's daily life, relationships, or activities).

Notably, of the above terms, only misophonia is widely used by researchers, clinicians, and sufferers of the condition. It is the primary term used for the condition in mainstream journalistic coverage and by the primary philanthropic agency funding research into it, The Misophonia Research Fund (MRF), and the term selected for use in an (MRF-funded) project to derive a field-wide consensus definition of the condition for clinical and research use.

== Signs and symptoms ==
Misophonia is a disorder of sound tolerance characterized by extreme and disproportionate emotional reactions to specific sounds (or less commonly, visual stimuli) in one's environment, termed "triggers." Trigger stimuli are experienced as extremely unpleasant or distressing and tend to evoke a "misophonic reaction" that consists of both unpleasant negative emotions (i.e., extreme irritation, anger, anxiety, or disgust; less commonly rage or panic) and increased sympathetic arousal (manifested in physical symptoms such as muscle tension, increased heart rate, and sweating).

There may also be a feeling of unwanted sexual arousal, similar to the obsessive–compulsive complex known as groinal response, upon encountering the trigger stimulus. This symptom is often grossly misunderstood and misinterpreted, but not uncommon or unusual.

Trigger stimuli are highly varied and sometimes idiosyncratic. Certain stimuli, such as chewing and other oronasal sounds, are among the most commonly reported triggers in both clinically referred and population-based samples. The Duke Misophonia Questionnaire, a commonly used misophonia symptom measure, groups misophonia triggers into the following categories:

- People making mouth sounds while eating or drinking (e.g., chewing, crunching, slurping).
- People making nasal or throat sounds (e.g., sniffing, sneezing, nose-whistling, coughing, throat clearing).
- People making mouth sounds when not eating (e.g., flossing, whispering, making the "tsk" sound, heavy breathing, snoring, whistling).
- People making repetitive sounds (e.g., typing, tapping nails on a table, pen clicking, writing, construction work, using machinery).
- Rustling or tearing objects (e.g., paper, plastic).
- Sounds produced during speech (e.g., "p" sounds, hissing "s" sounds, someone speaking with a lisp, high-pitched voices, whispering or mouthing words).
- Body or joint sounds (e.g., finger snapping, joint cracking, jaw clicking).
- Rubbing sounds (e.g., hands on pants, hands against one another, Styrofoam rubbing together).
- Stomping or loud walking (e.g., heels clicking, flip flops, etc.).
- Muffled sounds (e.g., voices separated by a wall, TV or music in another room).
- People talking in the background (e.g., phone calls in public, many people talking at once, unintelligible whispering).
- Repetitive or continuous sounds made by inanimate objects (e.g., clock ticking, air conditioner humming, running water).
- Animals making repetitive sounds (e.g., licking, chirping, barking, eating, drinking).
- Seeing someone making or about to make a specific sound that causes distress, even if the sound itself isn't audible (e.g., seeing someone reach into a bag of chips, seeing someone eating on TV with the volume off).

Although less well studied, reported visual triggers in misokinesia include another person's repetitive movements (foot or leg shaking, arms swinging, hands rubbing together, hair twirling, fidgeting), as well as the sight of an auditory trigger that one cannot actually hear (such as someone chewing with their mouth open or tapping their fingers on a desk).

Reactions to triggers can range from mild (extreme irritation, anxiety, disgust, or physical discomfort) to severe (anger, rage, hatred, fear, panic, or profound emotional distress). A number of physical symptoms may also accompany the misophonic response, including muscle tension, increased heart rate, sweating, and a feeling of pressure in one's body. Other idiosyncratic physical and cognitive symptoms are also possible.

The five dimensions of cognitive-behavioral responses to "triggers", as empirically derived from the "S-Five" (another misophonia questionnaire that was used in the first large-scale prevalence study of the condition in the UK), are as follows:

- Internalizing appraisals such as self-critical thoughts, feeling guilty about one's reactions, and feeling ashamed for reacting to triggers
- Externalizing appraisals such as blaming others for making triggering sounds, feeling that others are being selfish or disrespectful, and believing that specific sounds are "just bad manners" and should never be made by anyone
- Anxiety or avoidance responses such as isolating oneself, moving away from the sound, or limiting opportunities to avoid potential trigger exposure
- Feeling threatened or overwhelmed such as feeling trapped, having thoughts of helplessness, or panicking when one can't escape a trigger
- Aggressive outbursts such as yelling, screaming, pushing, hitting, throwing things, or (rarely in adults) becoming physically violent

People with misophonia, particularly adults, are typically aware that their emotional reactions and behaviors in response to triggers are disproportionate to the situation, and this frequently causes some degree of internal conflict due to a desire to suppress these reactions.

The first misophonic reaction typically occurs when a person is young, often between the ages of 9 and 13. But misophonia can have an onset at any age, with cases as young as two years old and a number of adult-onset cases reported in the literature. The initial misophonic reaction will often originate from someone in a close relationship or a pet.

Fear and anxiety associated with trigger sounds can cause people with this condition to avoid important social and other interactions that may expose them to these sounds. This avoidance and other behaviors can make it harder for them to achieve their goals and enjoy interpersonal interactions. It can also have a significant adverse effect on their careers and relationships. Many people with misophonia experience worsening mental health, and some develop psychopathology secondary to their misophonia, including depression, anxiety, phonophobia, self-harm behaviors, and suicidality.

== Diagnosis ==
In 2022, clinical and scientific leaders convened to create a consensus definition of misophonia, agreeing that it is a disorder of decreased tolerance to specific sounds and their associated stimuli. During the early phase of research on misophonia, it was defined by different criteria, and different methods were used to diagnose it and assess symptom severity. As a result of a lack of consensus about how to define and evaluate misophonia, comparisons between study cohorts were difficult, measurement tools were not psychometrically well-validated, and the field could not rigorously assess the efficacy of different treatment approaches. The consensus definition is still not universally accepted by misophonia experts.

Despite some early proposals, there is no scholarly consensus about diagnostic criteria or assessment procedures for misophonia. Many doctors are unaware of the disorder.

It appears that misophonia can occur on its own or with other health, developmental, and psychiatric problems. These comorbid conditions include anxiety disorders, post-traumatic stress disorder, obsessive–compulsive disorder (OCD), and depressive disorders. Misophonia is distinguishable from hyperacusis, which is not specific to a given sound and need not involve a similarly strong emotional reaction, and from phonophobia, the fear of sounds, but it may occur with either. When attempting to diagnose a patient with misophonia, doctors sometimes mistake its symptoms for an anxiety disorder, bipolar disorder, OCD, or obsessive-compulsive personality disorder.

Due in part to the need for differential diagnosis with other psychiatric and audiological conditions, academic commentaries make various recommendations regarding misophonia assessment, including that misophonia diagnoses be made by multidisciplinary groups and draw upon multiple sources of data.

=== Classification ===
The diagnosis of misophonia is not recognized in the DSM-5-TR or the ICD-11 and it is not classified as a hearing or psychiatric disorder.

The consensus among misophonia experts is that the relationship between misophonia and other conditions is unclear. Scholars debate whether misophonia should be considered an audiological or psychiatric disorder, with some evidence favoring the latter view. It has been tentatively suggested that misophonia belongs to the spectrum of obsessive–compulsive and related disorders, although the authors of that proposal also describe it as "premature".

=== Measures ===
Misophonia has generally been measured using adult self-report questionnaires. A 2021 review of misophonia and hyperacusis measures found only three misophonia instruments with reported psychometric properties, all of which were adult self-report measures; the review called the evidence regarding the measures' psychometrics "limited". Psychometric properties of several additional adult self-report misophonia measures have since been reported in the scholarly literature. Further unvalidated misophonia questionnaires are available on the internet.

More recently, self-report and caregiver proxy-report measures to assess misophonia in children and youth have begun to appear in the scholarly literature. At least one study uses interviews with caregivers, and sometimes their children, to assess misophonia in children and adolescents.

Another relatively novel development in misophonia assessment is a psychoacoustic measure, which uses adults' self-reported ratings of the pleasantness of sounds to identify a set of sounds that appear to distinguish between people with and without misophonia.

Due to the difficulty of distinguishing misophonia from other psychiatric and audiological conditions, it is unclear whether any single tool can be relied upon to diagnose misophonia. It has been suggested that assessment should involve the collection of multiple sources of data, such as patient case histories, interviews, audiological examination, and self-report tools.

== Management ==
Despite high demand in the community, there has been relatively limited research into misophonia treatment and intervention, and few clinical providers have extensive knowledge of it. People seeking misophonia treatment often rate it unsatisfactory. Indeed, no misophonia treatments or interventions currently qualify as evidence-based. But several recent studies investigated cognitive behavioral therapy (CBT) as an option, and there are reports of other approaches, including tinnitus retraining therapy (TRT), exposure therapy, third-wave psychotherapies such as dialectical behavior therapy (DBT), and acceptance and commitment therapy (ACT), and some pharmacological treatments.

CBT-based programs have the strongest evidentiary support of any misophonia treatment so far. Trials of a group-based CBT program, including a randomized clinical trial, have found reductions in misophonia symptoms, which appeared to be maintained one year later. Another randomized clinical trial evaluated a CBT-based mobile health app, which also appeared to reduce misophonia symptoms.

Several case reports on third-wave psychotherapies such as DBT or ACT have found preliminary evidence of possible benefits. Additional research is needed to understand the potential utility of ACT and DBT approaches for misophonia intervention.

Investigations of pharmacological treatments for misophonia have been limited to case studies, most frequently of selective serotonin reuptake inhibitors (SSRIs) such as sertraline and fluoxetine. Other case reports discuss how misophonia symptoms may have been secondarily affected by propranolol, risperidone, or methylphenidate prescribed to address other conditions. These case studies may provide directions for further research, such as understanding neurophysiological mechanisms and processes that could be targeted through medication and conducting larger randomized controlled trials. No medications for misophonia can be considered evidence-based.

Many approaches to misophonia treatment leverage the idea that negative evaluations of trigger sounds can be disrupted and replaced by more positive associations. This is the main focus of TRT for misophonia, and it has also been leveraged in CBT-based approaches. A report from a clinical service suggests that most patients with misophonia benefited from TRT, a result that has been called good or promising. But counterconditioning and stimulus manipulation—changing trigger sounds or pairing them with pleasant or humorous stimuli to disrupt negative affective evaluations—were infrequently used by participants in a misophonia CBT trial. The patients considered these less effective than other strategies used in the program. Traditional habituation-based exposure therapy is not recommended for misophonia.

Several studies report that a common approach to misophonia management is to amend one's lifestyle and avoid trigger sounds, and people with misophonia generally perceive lifestyle changes as highly appropriate. Noise-cancelling headphones and passive sound protection are frequently used and rated by community members as highly appropriate. But there is clinical concern that avoidance might be dysfunctional and could even inadvertently tend to exacerbate some sound intolerance, although some evidence suggests people with misophonia who avoid triggers more often may later have fewer role limitations due to emotional problems, which may suggest that at least some level of avoidance is beneficial. There are other approaches to management and coping; some people with misophonia mimic trigger sounds, either to retaliate or cancel them out in a way they can control. People with misophonia may attempt cognitive strategies such as self-talk and diverting their attention. Relaxation is also commonly attempted. Participants in a CBT program considered relaxation, training to shift attention away from triggers, and peer support the most successful parts of the intervention.

Given the limited nature of the misophonia intervention evidence base, it has been suggested that providers work collaboratively and flexibly with patients to identify strategies that are useful to them. It is speculated that treatment methods vary significantly in effectiveness from patient to patient. Where there are gaps in the misophonia-specific literature, transdiagnostic research on interventions found to be efficacious or effective for other conditions may be relevant. Multidisciplinary treatment approaches, incorporating insights from diverse experts such as audiologists, mental health professionals, and occupational therapists, may also improve the quality of support.

== Mechanism ==
The mechanism of misophonia is not yet fully understood, and all proposed causes of the disorder are hypothesized based on a combination of clinical observation and the limited existing empirical research. Although misophonia is a disorder of sound tolerance, work to date has not typically demonstrated any peripheral audiologic abnormalities in people with the condition, suggesting that any "auditory" abnormalities may be caused by a dysfunction of the central auditory system or other parts of the brain that govern "higher-order" perceptor or cognition, rather than the ears per se.

Some research has found evidence consistent with the idea that there are genetic contributions to misophonia, but more research is needed. An unpublished study suggests a genetic locus is associated with responses to a single question asking about the misophonic symptom of experiencing rage to sounds of people chewing.

=== "Neurophysiological" (Jastreboff) model ===
The first mechanistic theory of misophonia, proposed by Jastreboff and Jastreboff in 2014, is based on the authors' clinical experience and little empirical data. This model, which the authors call the "neurophysiological model", seeks to contrast misophonia with hyperacusis, another disorder of sound tolerance that primarily manifests as excessive loudness perception (or the experience of physical pain in one's ears or head) in response to soft or moderate-intensity everyday sounds. The Jastreboffs' neurophysiological model posits that the fundamental difference between misophonia and hyperacusis is that decreased sound tolerance in hyperacusis is closely coupled to the physical properties of the sound stimulus (i.e., intensity, frequency) while, in misophonia, decreased tolerance of "trigger" sounds has little to do with acoustic properties (beyond louder sounds perhaps being easier to perceive and respond to) and arguably depends almost exclusively on the meaning of the sounds to a given person. Its creators have used this model to explain certain aspects of the misophonia phenotype, such as that most people with misophonia do not present with peripheral hearing loss and that context (including whether a trigger is produced by oneself) plays a large role in response to a trigger sound.

Although entirely speculative and not based on any empirical neuroscientific data on misophonia, the "neurophysiologic" model also postulates several putative neural mechanisms for the condition from a systems neuroscience perspective. Namely, when processing a trigger stimulus, the brain's central auditory system is thought to have enhanced functional connections with its limbic and autonomic control areas, and downstream overactivity of these areas is theorized to be responsible for the excessive emotional responses and certain physical symptoms of the condition, respectively. These preliminary neuroscientific hypotheses form the basis of the Jastreboffs' signature intervention for sound tolerance conditions (Tinnitus Retraining Therapy, an unproven combination of structured counseling and sound therapy originally developed for tinnitus and now available in modified form to treat misophonia).

Notably, there has been relatively little empirical support for the central neuroscientific hypotheses of the neurophysiologic model. Although there has been a relative lack of neuroimaging research on misophonia thus far, functional connectivity between auditory cortical and limbic or autonomic control areas is not typically increased either at rest or during the experience of trigger sound perception. Though many of these same limbic and autonomic control areas may still be relevant in the pathophysiology of misophonia (with anterior insula being one of the most strongly implicated nodes thus far), recent reviews of human neuroimaging research in this condition indicate that (a) their activation may be driven by other pathways than simple auditory→limbic or auditory→limbic→autonomic hyper-connectivity and (b) additional structures outside of the Jastreboffs' model (such as premotor cortex) may play a central role in this disorder. Other theorists have also criticized the "neurophysiologic" model for its vagueness and unwillingness to specify the specific neural structures and processes involved in the "limbic system" portion of the model, as well as its inability to account for non-sound trigger stimuli.

=== "Action perception" (Berger–Gander–Kumar) model ===
A more recently developed model of misophonia was published by neuroscientist Sukhbinder Kumar and colleagues at the University of Iowa in 2024. This model, not formally named by the authors but termed the "action perception" model by other researchers using it (alternatively the Berger–Gander–Kumar model), sought to build on the perceived shortcomings of earlier models by explicitly incorporating more up-to-date empirical findings in the behavioral, clinical and neuroimaging literature on misophonia; providing explanations for the presence of non-auditory (i.e., visual) and multi-sensory trigger stimuli; and considering perspectives from social cognitive theory and social neuroscience in the broader theory. Although the action perception model is consistent with many of the findings in the misophonia neuroimaging literature, it was generated specifically to explain those findings and therefore represents something of a "just-so story" until its predictions can be empirically validated.

Based on what is known from neuroimaging and behavioral studies of misophonia, the action perception model conceptualizes the disorder as follows:

- Sensory information about any stimulus travels from the ear (eye in the case of visual information) through lemniscal/non-lemniscal auditory pathways (or analogous visual pathways) to arrive at and be processed by primary and higher-level auditory cortex (visual cortex).
- Information is transmitted from a sensory cortex (auditory or visual) to the (pre)motor cortex to form a motor representation of a given action (putatively related to the human "mirror neuron" system).
- Under pathological conditions (e.g., when an individual with misophonia hears a sound that "triggers" them):
  - The strength or quality of the "motor representation" may be fundamentally different from that in non-misophonic people, as demonstrated by hyperactivity of regions responsible for creating these representations.
  - The aberrant motor representation conveys an abnormally strong signal to the (anterior) insular cortex, which is then hyperactive relative to non-misophonic controls.
  - Although it is less clear whether this pathway is aberrant or hyperactive due to mixed/limited empirical findings, the insula communicates this signal to (a) the amygdala (putatively responsible for the extreme emotional responses during a misophonic reaction) and (b) autonomic control centers such as the periaqueductal gray and several hypothalamic nuclei (putatively responsible for physiologic aspects of a misophonic reaction, such as changes in heart rate, skin conductance, and potentially other subjective symptoms of being triggered).
- Though the action perception model denotes the "information flow" through the central nervous system as unidirectional, the authors note that more complex bidirectional interactions between the various nodes of the implicated brain network are likely.

The action perception model arguably represents a major advance over previous theoretical work in this area, particularly in its ability to explain the neuroimaging data on misophonia published before 2024, when the theory was first proposed. Additionally, by focusing on higher-order "motor representations" of objects or actions that are abstracted from their initial sensory information and represented in association cortex (i.e., (pre)motor and limbic areas), the model can be applied to both the auditory and non-auditory triggers of misophonia (i.e., misokinesia) just as easily. But the action perception model appears to apply only to misophonic reactions to human-generated trigger sounds. The action perception model appears consistent with certain clinical features of misophonia, such as the extreme context-specificity of the condition, given that the perceived (even if incorrectly perceived) source of the sound and whether the source can be identified appear to be among the largest drivers of the severity of a given misophonic reaction. Last, although still largely speculative, the action perception model provides an explanation for the peculiar observation that many people with misophonia (46.7% of this population in a recent study by Kumar's group) engage in mimicry (deliberate or unconscious imitation of the trigger sound). As the anterior insula is engaged when counter-imitating an action (i.e., performing the opposite of the imitated movement), Kumar and colleagues theorize that this mimicry conveys an "error signal" that helps inhibit the hyperactive insular cortex involved in the triggering process, thereby reducing the intensity of the misophonic response.

Despite its apparent success in explaining findings in the misophonia literature, the action perception model's predictions are largely untested, and many aspects of the model rely on empirical studies with substantial methodological limitations. The basic neural mechanisms of action perception, mimicry, and the role (if any) of the "human mirror neuron system" within a broader social cognition framework in non-clinical populations must be further explored. The role of other co-occurring conditions, particularly those such as autism that are known to both affect social cognition and cooccur with misophonia at exceptionally high rates, is also an area for future research to explore and test the model. The evidence supporting the action perception model is essentially correlational, not causal; that is, it is unclear whether motor representations cause misophonic reactions or misophonia is a primarily auditory experience sometimes accompanied by motor representations.

== Epidemiology ==
Research is still being conducted on misophonia's global prevalence, and studies of misophonia's prevalence vary considerably. Several studies have investigated misophonia prevalence in samples representative of national populations. In these studies, many people—33%, 79%, or 96%—reported negative reactions to at least one misophonia trigger sound. The prevalence of clinically significant levels of misophonia was much lower. An online representative study in the United Kingdom found 18% of participants reported a significant burden from misophonia. This study has been cited in popular outlets, including BBC, Medscape, and Medical Xpress. A household interview study in Ankara, Turkey, reported a slightly lower prevalence of 13%. A United States representative web-based panel study reported a misophonia prevalence of just 5%, but this study required participants to score in the clinical range on not one but two misophonia measures. A German study in which participants filled out questionnaires during household visits reports a seemingly similar 5% prevalence, but this is based on a single measure that in the U.S. study yielded a prevalence of 14%. When the German study requires clinical criteria to be met on two measures, prevalence drops to only 2%. A second German study, using a single measure, reported similar or slightly lower levels of clinical misophonia symptoms compared to the first German study.

Authors of both German studies discussed the possibility that misophonia may be less common in Germany than in countries like Turkey or the U.S. Methodological explanations for the studies' divergent results cannot be ruled out. Still, evidence does suggest misophonia is not specific to any one culture. For example, although these are not representative population studies, research has reported misophonia prevalences of 6% among Chinese university students and 24% among Iranian university students.

Misophonia symptoms may vary along a continuous spectrum, with varying proportions of people experiencing few or no, mild, moderate, or severe symptoms. Accordingly, the consensus definition of misophonia recognises that misophonia severity and expression vary.

Although some studies report the prevalence and severity of misophonia are similar across genders, others report female individuals are more likely to have misophonia than males. At least among youth and adults, younger age may be related to higher levels of misophonia symptoms, though other studies find no relationship between age and misophonia.

== Associated experiences ==
There is some indication that misophonia may be related to the experience of autonomous sensory meridian response (ASMR), or auto-sensory meridian response, a pleasant form of paresthesia, a tingling sensation that typically begins on the scalp and moves down the back of the neck and upper spine. ASMR is described as the opposite of what can be observed in reactions to specific audio stimuli in misophonia. Studies have reported high prevalence of ASMR in people with misophonia. But one of these studies also reported that ASMR susceptibility may be negatively correlated with misophonia symptom severity. Conversely, a general population study suggests that emotional reactions to videos designed to induce misophonia, ASMR, and musical chills are all positively related to one another. Other research shows no relationship between ASMR and misophonia.

Misophonia also appears to be related to higher levels of sensory hyper-responsivity across multiple modalities. Further, in the auditory modality, misophonia also appears to be related to other forms of sound intolerance. Many people with hyperacusis experience co-occurring misophonia and hyperacusis and tinnitus impact are related to misophonia symptoms.

Moreover, several studies suggest that people with misophonia are more likely to have emotion regulation difficulties. Misophonia has also been linked to behavioural impulsivity.

Several studies also link misophonia to anxiety. Higher levels of perfectionism have been reported in people with misophonia.

Several studies suggest people with misophonia may show greater attention to detail.

Misophonia has been linked to obsessive–compulsive disorder. Not-just-right experiences also appear to be more common in people with misophonia.

== Society and culture ==
People who experience misophonia have formed online support groups. Nonprofit organizations such as soQuiet, Misophonia Hub, and Teens for Education + Advocacy for Misophonia (TEAM) actively share resources for people affected by misophonia. In 2025, Duke University's Center for Misophonia and Emotion Regulation (CMER) partnered with the Italian Misophonia association, TEAM, Swansea University, and others to host a research workshop called PRIMER for high school students to gain knowledge in the science of misophonia, conduct of human research, and project development.

In 2016, a documentary about the condition, Quiet Please, was released.

In 2020, a team of misophonia researchers received the Ig Nobel Prize in medicine "for diagnosing a long-unrecognized medical condition".

The 2022 film Tár depicts a conductor with misophonia.

In 2024, the misophonia advocacy organization soQuiet created World Misophonia Awareness Day, to be held on July 9, the birthday of Michelle Del Valle, a 17-year-old who took her own life due to her struggles with misophonia. Many organizations, advocates, and individuals have used this awareness day to share information about misophonia, especially among medical professionals, and work to build community connections for people affected by misophonia.

=== Notable cases ===
- Melissa Gilbert
- Richard E. Grant
- Glenn Howerton
- Barron H. Lerner
- Lisa Loeb
- Melanie Lynskey
- Laila McQueen
- Kelly Osbourne
- Kelly Ripa
- Sarah Silverman
- Pharrell Williams
- January Jones
- James Norton

== See also ==
- Active noise control
- Auditory hypersensitivity
- Chalkboard scraping
- Hearing protection device
- Hyperacusis
- Noise control
- Phonophobia
- Safe listening
- Sensory processing disorder
- Stimulus control
- Tinnitus retraining therapy
