= Misokinesia =

Sensory disorder related to misophonia

Misokinesia is a condition marked by a strong negative emotional or physiological response to the sight of repeated movements made by other people, such as fidgeting, leg shaking, hair twirling, and others.

== Symptoms and Characteristics ==
It is often described as a "hatred of movements" and can lead to feelings of annoyance, anger, and prolonged and notable anxiety. Many subjects have also experienced violent impulses alongside physical symptoms such as sweating and nausea. There is no formal diagnosis for misokinesia, and the cause is currently unknown.

There are also no reliable ways to test for misokinesia, but studies have utilized a test for misophonia called the Misophonia Assessment Questionnaire (MAQ), that usually assesses auditory stimuli to evaluate individuals reaction to visual stimuli.

== Social and Everyday Impacts ==
Misokinesia can result in many social challenges, such as obstacles in maintaining positive social relationships, and struggles to effectively communicate when it comes to the condition. According to misokinesia researcher and psychologist Sumeet Jaswal, "it's the people who you're around most of the time that'll trigger you."

== Coping Strategies ==
While misokinesia has no formal treatments, a common coping mechanism is obscuring the person moving from view, and some have found that psychotherapy and copying the action has caused the movement to disturb them less.

Additionally, steroids have been used in the past to treat an extreme case of both misokinesia and misophonia in which the subjects symptoms were so severe that he had resorted to maintaining distance from loved ones and taking time off work. The steroid used in this case was prednisone, which was deemed effective in minimizing reactions to auditory and visual triggers.

== Research and Prevalence ==
Misokinesia, while thought to be quite prevalent, was only formally reported in 2021, so there has been little awareness or research of it. Misokinesia is commonly comorbid with misophonia; in a sample of over one thousand adults from Amazon Mechanical Turk, 25.5% reported having both misokinesia and misophonia.
