= Guy Lee =

British scholar and poet (1918–2005)

Arthur Guy Lee (5 November 1918 – 31 July 2005), known informally as Guy Lee, was a British Classical scholar and poet. He was particularly notable as a Latinist for his work on the Roman poets Ovid, Propertius, and Catullus; he also translated Virgil's Eclogues, Tibullus, and Persius.

== Life and career ==
Lee was educated at Glebe House, a preparatory school in Hunstanton, and later at Loretto School, a public school in Musselburgh, Scotland, before going up to St John's College, Cambridge. He taught at the University of Cambridge for most of his career, where he was admitted as a fellow of St John's College in 1946.

In the Second World War, Lee joined the British military, and was posted in Iceland, where he learned Icelandic and earned a military award for his work on ciphers. He was later posted to French North Africa, Belgium, Italy, Norway, and Germany. He returned to Cambridge after the war.

In 2001, Lee was asked by professor Pawel J. Jastreboff, and doctor Margaret M. Jastreboff for assistance in the naming of a condition exemplified by decreased tolerance to specific sounds or their associated stimuli. The name finally decided upon was misophonia.

Upon returning to Cambridge, Lee served as a librarian, tutor, praelector, and lecturer of classics at various times. He died in Cambridge in 2005, and is buried at Ascension Parish Burial Ground.
