= Ground source heat pump =

System to transfer heat to/from the ground

A heat pump in combination with heat and cold storage

A ground source heat pump (also geothermal heat pump) is a heating/cooling system for buildings that use a heat pump to transfer heat to or from the ground, taking advantage of the relative constancy of temperatures of the earth through the seasons. Ground-source heat pumps (GSHPs)—or geothermal heat pumps (GHPs), as they are commonly termed in North America—are among the most energy-efficient technologies for providing HVAC and water heating, using less energy than that consumed by resistive electric heaters.

Efficiency is given as a coefficient of performance (CoP) which is typically in the range 3–6, meaning that the devices provide 3–6 units of heat for each unit of electricity used. Setup costs are higher than for other heating systems due to the requirement of installing ground loops over large areas or of drilling bore holes. Air-source heat pumps have lower set-up costs but have a lower CoP in very cold or very hot weather.

== Thermal properties of the ground ==
Ground-source heat pumps take advantage of the difference between the ambient temperature and the temperature at various depths in the ground.

The thermal properties of the ground near the surface can be described as follows:

- In the surface layer to a depth of about 1 meter, the temperature is very sensitive to sunlight and weather.
- In the shallow layer to a depth of about 8–20 meters (depending on soil type), the thermal mass of the ground causes temperature variation to decrease exponentially with depth until it is close to the local annual average air temperature; it also lags behind the surface temperature, so that the peak temperature is about 6 months after the surface peak temperature.
- Below that, in the deeper layer, the temperature is effectively constant, rising about 0.025 °C per metre according to the geothermal gradient.

The "penetration depth" is defined as the depth at which the temperature variable is less than 0.01 of the variation at the surface. This also depends on the type of soil:

Penetration depth in metres of diurnal and annual temperature cycles
Soil Type	Day (m)	Year (m)
Rock	1.10	20.5
Wet clay	0.95	18.0
Wet sand	0.80	14.5
Dry clay	0.40	6.5
Dry sand	0.30	4.5

== History ==
The heat pump was described by Lord Kelvin in 1853 and developed by Peter Ritter von Rittinger in 1855. Heinrich Zoelly had patented the idea of using it to draw heat from the ground in 1912.

After experimentation with a freezer, Robert C. Webber built the first direct exchange ground source heat pump in the late 1940s; sources disagree, however, as to the exact timeline of his invention. The first successful commercial project was installed in the Commonwealth Building (Portland, Oregon) in 1948, and has been designated a National Historic Mechanical Engineering Landmark by ASME. Professor Carl Nielsen of Ohio State University built the first residential open loop version in his home in 1948.

As a result of the 1973 oil crisis, ground source heat pumps became popular in Sweden and have since grown slowly in worldwide popularity as the technology has improved. Open loop systems dominated the market until the development of polybutylene pipe in 1979 made closed loop systems economically viable.

As of 2004, there are over a million units installed worldwide, providing 12 GW of thermal capacity with a growth rate of 10% per year. Each year (as of 2011/2004, respectively), about 80,000 units are installed in the US and 27,000 in Sweden. In Finland, a geothermal heat pump was the most common heating system choice for new detached houses between 2006 and 2011 with market share exceeding 40%. In 2021, heat pumps accounted for 10% of global heating equipment sales.

In the United Kingdom, the 2022 Boiler Upgrade Scheme has driven demand for ground source heat pumps. In 2023, 2,469 ground source heat pumps were installed in the UK. The scheme closes in 2027.

== Arrangement ==
=== Internal arrangement ===
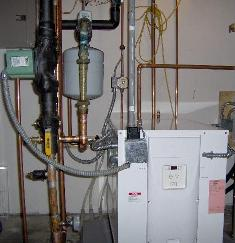
Liquid-to-water heat pump

A heat pump is the central unit for the building's heating and cooling. It usually comes in two main variants:

Liquid-to-water heat pumps (also called water-to-water) are hydronic systems that carry heating or cooling through the building through pipes to conventional radiators, underfloor heating, baseboard radiators and hot water tanks. These heat pumps are also preferred for pool heating. Heat pumps typically only heat water to about 55 °C (131 °F) efficiently, whereas boilers typically operate at 65–95 °C (149–203 °F). The size of radiators designed for the higher temperatures achieved by boilers may be too small for use with heat pumps, requiring replacement with larger radiators when retrofitting a home from boiler to heat pump. When used for cooling, the temperature of the circulating water must normally be kept above the dew point to ensure that atmospheric humidity does not condense on the radiator.

Liquid-to-air heat pumps (also called water-to-air) output forced air, and are most commonly used to replace legacy forced air furnaces and central air conditioning systems. There are variations that allow for split systems, high-velocity systems, and ductless systems. Heat pumps cannot achieve as high a fluid temperature as a conventional furnace, and require a higher volume flow rate of air to compensate.

=== Ground heat exchanger ===
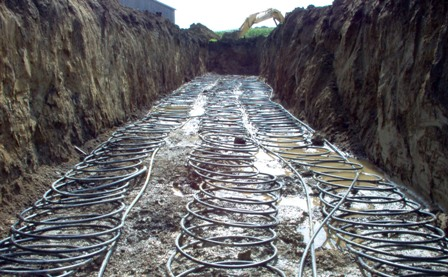
A horizontal slinky loop prior to being covered with soil

Ground source heat pumps employ a ground heat exchanger in contact with the ground or groundwater to extract or dissipate heat. Pipework for the ground loop is typically made of high-density polyethylene pipe and contains a mixture of water and anti-freeze (propylene glycol, denatured alcohol or methanol). Monopropylene glycol has the least damaging potential when it might leak into the ground, and is, therefore, the only allowed anti-freeze in ground sources in an increasing number of European countries.

Horizontal

A horizontal closed loop field is composed of pipes that are arrayed in a plane in the ground. A long trench, deeper than the frost line, is dug and U-shaped or slinky coils are spread out inside the same trench. Shallow 3–8-foot (0.91–2.44 m) horizontal heat exchangers experience seasonal temperature cycles due to solar gains and transmission losses to ambient air at ground level. These temperature cycles lag behind the seasons because of thermal inertia, so the heat exchanger will harvest heat deposited by the sun several months earlier, while being weighed down in late winter and spring, due to accumulated winter cold. Systems in wet ground or in water are generally more efficient than drier ground loops since water conducts and stores heat better than solids in sand or soil. If the ground is naturally dry, soaker hoses may be buried with the ground loop to keep it wet.

Vertical

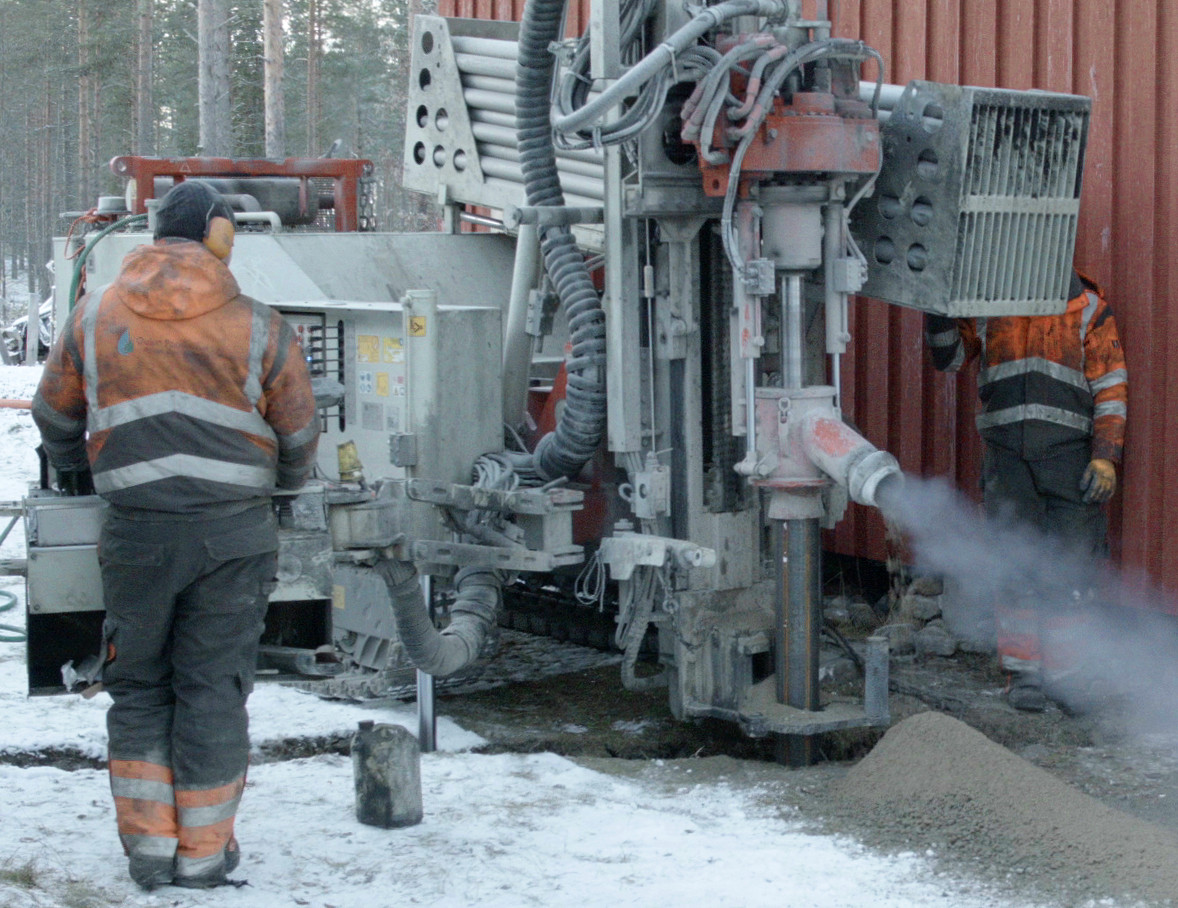
Drilling of a borehole for residential heating

A vertical system consists of a number of boreholes some 50 to 400 feet (15–122 m) deep fitted with U-shaped pipes through which a heat-carrying fluid that absorbs (or discharges) heat from (or to) the ground is circulated. Bore holes are spaced at least 5–6 m apart and the depth depends on ground and building characteristics. Alternatively, pipes may be integrated with the foundation piles used to support the building. Vertical systems rely on migration of heat from surrounding geology, unless recharged during the summer and at other times when surplus heat is available.

Vertical systems are typically used where there is insufficient available land for a horizontal system. For illustration, a detached house needing 10 kW (3 ton) of heating capacity might need three boreholes 80 to 110 m (260 to 360 ft) deep.

Radial or directional drilling

As an alternative to trenching, loops may be laid by mini horizontal directional drilling (mini-HDD). This technique can lay piping under yards, driveways, gardens or other structures without disturbing them, with a cost between those of trenching and vertical drilling. This system also differs from horizontal & vertical drilling as the loops are installed from one central chamber, further reducing the ground space needed. Radial drilling is often installed retroactively (after the property has been built) due to the small nature of the equipment used and the ability to bore beneath existing constructions.

Open loop

In an open-loop system (also called a groundwater heat pump), the secondary loop pumps natural water from a well or body of water into a heat exchanger inside the heat pump. Since the water chemistry is not controlled, the appliance may need to be protected from corrosion by using different metals in the heat exchanger and pump. Limescale may foul the system over time and require periodic acid cleaning. This is much more of a problem with cooling systems than heating systems. A standing column well system is a specialized type of open-loop system where water is drawn from the bottom of a deep rock well, passed through a heat pump, and returned to the top of the well. A growing number of jurisdictions have outlawed open-loop systems that drain to the surface because these may drain aquifers or contaminate wells. This forces the use of more environmentally sound injection wells or a closed-loop system.

Pond

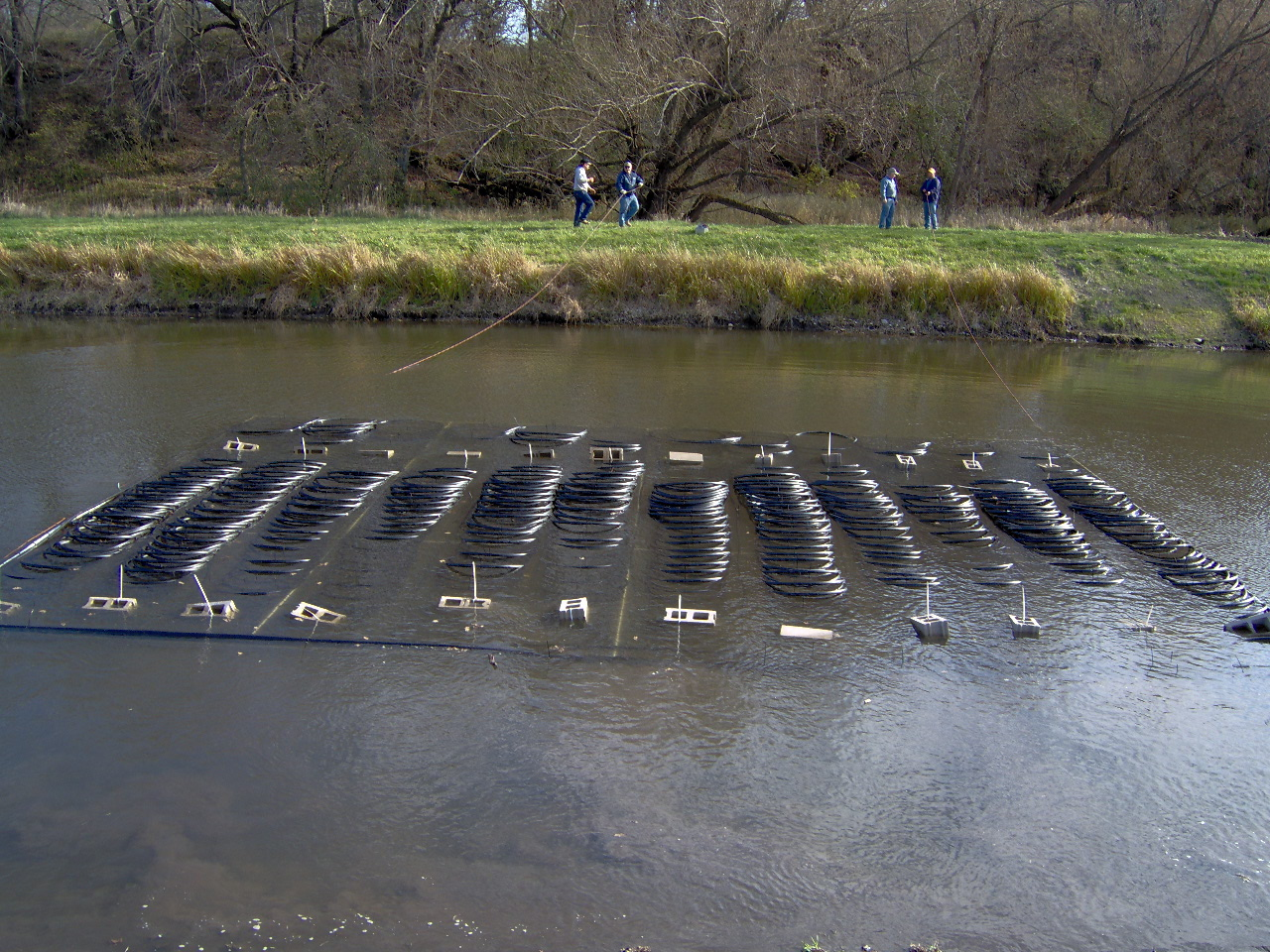
12-ton pond loop system being sunk to the bottom of a pond

A closed pond loop consists of coils of pipe similar to a slinky loop attached to a frame and located at the bottom of an appropriately sized pond or water source. Artificial ponds are used as heat storage (up to 90% efficient) in some central solar heating plants, which later extract the heat (similar to ground storage) via a large heat pump to supply district heating.

Direct exchange (DX)

The direct exchange geothermal heat pump (DX) is the oldest type of geothermal heat pump technology where the refrigerant itself is passed through the ground loop. Developed during the 1980s, this approach faced issues with the refrigerant and oil management system, especially after the ban of CFC refrigerants in 1989 and DX systems now are infrequently used.

== Installation ==
Because of the technical knowledge and equipment needed to design and size the system properly (and install the piping if heat fusion is required), a GSHP system installation requires a professional's services. Several installers have published real-time views of system performance in an online community of recent residential installations. The International Ground Source Heat Pump Association (IGSHPA), Geothermal Exchange Organization (GEO), Canadian GeoExchange Coalition and Ground Source Heat Pump Association maintain listings of qualified installers in the US, Canada and the UK. Furthermore, detailed analysis of soil thermal conductivity for horizontal systems and formation thermal conductivity for vertical systems will generally result in more accurately designed systems with a higher efficiency.

== Thermal performance ==
Cooling performance is typically expressed in units of BTU/hr/watt as the energy efficiency ratio (EER), while heating performance is typically reduced to dimensionless units as the coefficient of performance (COP). The conversion factor is 3.41 BTU/hr/watt. Since a heat pump moves three to five times more heat energy than the electric energy it consumes, the total energy output is much greater than the electrical input. This results in net thermal efficiencies greater than 300% as compared to radiant electric heat being 100% efficient. Traditional combustion furnaces and electric heaters can never exceed 100% efficiency. Ground source heat pumps can reduce energy consumption – and corresponding air pollution emissions – up to 72% compared to electric resistance heating with standard air-conditioning equipment.

Efficient compressors, variable speed compressors and larger heat exchangers all contribute to heat pump efficiency. Residential ground source heat pumps on the market today have standard COPs ranging from 2.4 to 5.0 and EERs ranging from 10.6 to 30. To qualify for an Energy Star label, heat pumps must meet certain minimum COP and EER ratings which depend on the ground heat exchanger type. For closed-loop systems, the ISO 13256-1 heating COP must be 3.3 or greater and the cooling EER must be 14.1 or greater.

Standards ARI 210 and 240 define Seasonal Energy Efficiency Ratio (SEER) and Heating Seasonal Performance Factors (HSPF) to account for the impact of seasonal variations on air source heat pumps. These numbers are normally not applicable and should not be compared to ground source heat pump ratings. However, Natural Resources Canada has adapted this approach to calculate typical seasonally adjusted HSPFs for ground-source heat pumps in Canada. The NRC HSPFs ranged from 8.7 to 12.8 BTU/hr/watt (2.6 to 3.8 in nondimensional factors, or 255% to 375% seasonal average electricity utilization efficiency) for the most populated regions of Canada.

For the sake of comparing heat pump appliances to each other, independently from other system components, a few standard test conditions have been established by the American Refrigerant Institute (ARI) and more recently by the International Organization for Standardization. Standard ARI 330 ratings were intended for closed-loop ground-source heat pumps, and assume secondary loop water temperatures of 25 °C (77 °F) for air conditioning and 0 °C (32 °F) for heating. These temperatures are typical of installations in the northern US. Standard ARI 325 ratings were intended for open-loop ground-source heat pumps, and include two sets of ratings for groundwater temperatures of 10 °C (50 °F) and 21 °C (70 °F). ARI 325 budgets more electricity for water pumping than ARI 330. Neither of these standards attempts to account for seasonal variations. Standard ARI 870 ratings are intended for direct exchange ground-source heat pumps. ASHRAE transitioned to ISO 13256–1 in 2001, which replaces ARI 320, 325 and 330. The new ISO standard produces slightly higher ratings because it no longer budgets any electricity for water pumps.

Soil without artificial heat addition or subtraction and at depths of several metres or more remains at a relatively constant temperature year round. This temperature equates roughly to the average annual air temperature of the chosen location, usually 7–12 °C (45–54 °F) at a depth of 6 metres (20 ft) in the northern US. Because this temperature remains more constant than the air temperature throughout the seasons, ground source heat pumps perform with far greater efficiency during extreme air temperatures than air conditioners and air-source heat pumps.

=== Analysis of heat transfer ===
A challenge in predicting the thermal response of a ground heat exchanger (GHE) is the diversity of the time and space scales involved. Four space scales and eight time scales are involved in the heat transfer of GHEs. The first space scale having practical importance is the diameter of the borehole (~ 0.1 m) and the associated time is on the order of 1 hr, during which the effect of the heat capacity of the backfilling material is significant. The second important space dimension is the half distance between two adjacent boreholes, which is on the order of several meters. The corresponding time is on the order of a month, during which the thermal interaction between adjacent boreholes is important. The largest space scale can be tens of meters or more, such as the half-length of a borehole and the horizontal scale of a GHE cluster. The time scale involved is as long as the lifetime of a GHE (decades).

The short-term hourly temperature response of the ground is vital for analyzing the energy of ground-source heat pump systems and for their optimum control and operation. By contrast, the long-term response determines the overall feasibility of a system from the standpoint of the life cycle.

The main questions that engineers may ask in the early stages of designing a GHE are (a) what the heat transfer rate of a GHE as a function of time is, given a particular temperature difference between the circulating fluid and the ground, and (b) what the temperature difference as a function of time is, given a required heat exchange rate. In the language of heat transfer, the two questions can probably be expressed as $q_l = [T_f(t) - T_0]/R(t)$

where T_{f} is the average temperature of the circulating fluid, T_{0} is the effective, undisturbed temperature of the ground, q_{l} is the heat transfer rate of the GHE per unit time per unit length (W/m), and R is the total thermal resistance (m^{.}K/W).R(t) is often an unknown variable that needs to be determined by heat transfer analysis. Despite R(t) being a function of time, analytical models exclusively decompose it into a time-independent part and a time-dependent part to simplify the analysis.

Various models for the time-independent and time-dependent R can be found in the references. Further, a thermal response test is often performed to make a deterministic analysis of ground thermal conductivity to optimize the loopfield size, especially for larger commercial sites (e.g., over 10 wells).

=== Seasonal thermal storage ===
A heat pump in combination with heat and cold storage

The efficiency of ground source heat pumps can be greatly improved by using seasonal thermal energy storage and interseasonal heat transfer. Heat captured and stored in thermal banks in the summer can be retrieved efficiently in the winter. Heat storage efficiency increases with scale, so this advantage is most significant in commercial or district heating systems.

Geosolar combisystems have been used to heat and cool a greenhouse using an aquifer for thermal storage. In summer, the greenhouse is cooled with cold ground water. This heats the water in the aquifer which can become a warm source for heating in winter. The combination of cold and heat storage with heat pumps can be combined with water/humidity regulation. These principles are used to provide renewable heat and renewable cooling to all kinds of buildings.

Also the efficiency of existing small heat pump installations can be improved by adding large, cheap, water-filled solar collectors. These may be integrated into a to-be-overhauled parking lot, or in walls or roof constructions by installing one-inch PE pipes into the outer layer.

== Environmental impact ==
The US Environmental Protection Agency (EPA) has called ground source heat pumps the most energy-efficient, environmentally clean, and cost-effective space conditioning systems available. Heat pumps offer significant emission reductions potential where the electricity is produced from renewable resources.

GSHPs have unsurpassed thermal efficiencies and produce zero emissions locally, but their electricity supply includes components with high greenhouse gas emissions unless it is a 100% renewable energy supply. Their environmental impact, therefore, depends on the characteristics of the electricity supply and the available alternatives.

Annual greenhouse gas (GHG) savings from using a ground source heat pump instead of a high-efficiency furnace in a detached residence (assuming no specific supply of renewable energy)
Country	Electricity CO_{2} Emissions Intensity	GHG savings relative to		
Country	Electricity CO_{2} Emissions Intensity	natural gas	heating oil	electric heating
Canada	223 ton/GWh	2.7 ton/yr	5.3 ton/yr	3.4 ton/yr
Russia	351 ton/GWh	1.8 ton/yr	4.4 ton/yr	5.4 ton/yr
US	676 ton/GWh	−0.5 ton/yr	2.2 ton/yr	10.3 ton/yr
China	839 ton/GWh	−1.6 ton/yr	1.0 ton/yr	12.8 ton/yr

The GHG emissions savings from a heat pump over a conventional furnace can be calculated based on the following formula:

$\text{GHG Savings}=\mathrm{HL} \left( \frac\mathrm{FI}{\mathrm{AFUE} \times 1000\frac\mathrm{kg}\mathrm{ton}}-\frac\mathrm{EI}{\mathrm{COP} \times 3600\frac\mathrm{sec}\mathrm{hr}}\right)$

- HL = seasonal heat load ≈ 80 GJ/yr for a modern detached house in the northern US
- FI = emissions intensity of fuel = 50 kg(CO_{2})/GJ for natural gas, 73 for heating oil, 0 for 100% renewable energy such as wind, hydro, photovoltaic or solar thermal
- AFUE = furnace efficiency ≈ 95% for a modern condensing furnace
- COP = heat pump coefficient of performance ≈ 3.2 seasonally adjusted for northern US heat pump
- EI = emissions intensity of electricity ≈ 200–800 ton(CO_{2})/GWh, depending on the region's mix of electric power plants (Coal vs Natural Gas vs Nuclear, Hydro, Wind & Solar)

Ground-source heat pumps always produce fewer greenhouse gases than air conditioners, oil furnaces, and electric heating, but natural gas furnaces may be competitive depending on the greenhouse gas intensity of the local electricity supply. In countries like Canada and Russia with low emitting electricity infrastructure, a residential heat pump may save 5 tons of carbon dioxide per year relative to an oil furnace, or about as much as taking an average passenger car off the road. But in cities like Beijing or Pittsburgh that are highly reliant on coal for electricity production, a heat pump may result in 1 or 2 tons more carbon dioxide emissions than a natural gas furnace. For areas not served by utility natural gas infrastructure, however, no better alternative exists.

The fluids used in closed loops may be designed to be biodegradable and non-toxic, but the refrigerant used in the heat pump cabinet and in direct exchange loops was, until recently, chlorodifluoromethane, which is an ozone-depleting substance. Although harmless while contained, leaks and improper end-of-life disposal contribute to enlarging the ozone hole. For new construction, this refrigerant is being phased out in favor of the ozone-friendly but potent greenhouse gas R410A. Open-loop systems (i.e. those that draw ground water as opposed to closed-loop systems using a borehole heat exchanger) need to be balanced by reinjecting the spent water. This prevents aquifer depletion and the contamination of soil or surface water with brine or other compounds from underground.

Before drilling, the underground geology needs to be understood, and drillers need to be prepared to seal the borehole, including preventing penetration of water between strata. The unfortunate example is a geothermal heating project in Staufen im Breisgau, Germany, which seems the cause of considerable damage to historical buildings there. In 2008, the city centre was reported to have risen 12 cm (4.7 in), after initially sinking a few millimeters. The boring tapped a naturally pressurized aquifer, and via the borehole this water entered a layer of anhydrite, which expands when wet as it forms gypsum. The swelling will stop when the anhydrite is fully reacted, and reconstruction of the city center "is not expedient until the uplift ceases". By 2010 sealing of the borehole had not been accomplished. By 2010, some sections of town had risen by 30 cm (12 in).

== Economics ==
Ground source heat pumps are characterized by high capital costs and low operational costs compared to other HVAC systems. Their overall economic benefit depends primarily on the relative costs of electricity and fuels, which are highly variable over time and across the world. Based on recent prices, ground-source heat pumps currently have lower operational costs than any other conventional heating source almost everywhere in the world. Natural gas is the only fuel with competitive operational costs, and only in a handful of countries where it is exceptionally cheap, or where electricity is exceptionally expensive. In general, a homeowner may save anywhere from 20% to 60% annually on utilities by switching from an ordinary system to a ground-source system.

Capital costs and system lifespan have received much less study until recently, and the return on investment is highly variable. The rapid escalation in system price has been accompanied by rapid improvements in efficiency and reliability. Capital costs are known to benefit from economies of scale, particularly for open-loop systems, so they are more cost-effective for larger commercial buildings and harsher climates. The initial cost can be two to five times that of a conventional heating system in most residential applications, new construction or existing. In retrofits, the cost of installation is affected by the size of the living area, the home's age, insulation characteristics, the geology of the area, and the location of the property. Proper duct system design and mechanical air exchange should be considered in the initial system cost.

Payback period for installing a ground source heat pump in a detached residence
Country	Payback period for replacing		
Country	natural gas	heating oil	electric heating
Canada	13 years	3 years	6 years
US	12 years	5 years	4 years
Germany	net loss	8 years	2 years
Notes: Highly variable with energy prices.; Government subsidies not included.; Climate differences not evaluated.

Capital costs may be offset by government subsidies; for example, Ontario offered $7000 for residential systems installed in the 2009 fiscal year. Some electric companies offer special rates to customers who install a ground-source heat pump for heating or cooling their building. Where electrical plants have larger loads during summer months and idle capacity in the winter, this increases electrical sales during the winter months. Heat pumps also lower the load peak during the summer due to the increased efficiency of heat pumps, thereby avoiding the costly construction of new power plants. For the same reasons, other utility companies have started to pay for the installation of ground-source heat pumps at customer residences. They lease the systems to their customers for a monthly fee, at a net overall saving to the customer.

The lifespan of the system is longer than conventional heating and cooling systems. Good data on system lifespan is not yet available because the technology is too recent, but many early systems are still operational today after 25–30 years with routine maintenance. Most loop fields have warranties for 25 to 50 years and are expected to last at least 50 to 200 years. Ground-source heat pumps use electricity for heating the house. The higher investment above conventional oil, propane or electric systems may be returned in energy savings in 2–10 years for residential systems in the US. The payback period for larger commercial systems in the US is 1–5 years, even when compared to natural gas. Additionally, because geothermal heat pumps usually have no outdoor compressors or cooling towers, the risk of vandalism is reduced or eliminated, potentially extending a system's lifespan.

Ground source heat pumps are recognized as one of the most efficient heating and cooling systems on the market. They are often the second-most cost-effective solution in extreme climates (after co-generation), despite reductions in thermal efficiency due to ground temperature. (The ground source is warmer in climates that need strong air conditioning, and cooler in climates that need strong heating.) The financial viability of these systems depends on the adequate sizing of ground heat exchangers (GHEs), which generally contribute the most to the overall capital costs of GSHP systems.

Commercial systems maintenance costs in the US have historically been between $0.11 to $0.22 per m^{2} per year in 1996 dollars, much less than the average $0.54 per m^{2} per year for conventional HVAC systems.

Governments that promote renewable energy will likely offer incentives for the consumer (residential), or industrial markets. For example, in the United States, incentives are offered both on the state and federal levels of government.

== See also ==
- Ground-coupled heat exchanger
- Thermal energy network
- Deep water source cooling
- Solar thermal cooling
- Renewable heat
- Glossary of geothermal heating and cooling
- Uniform Mechanical Code
