= Thermal response test =

A thermal response test (TRT) is used to determine the thermal properties of the ground. There is no direct way to measure ground thermal conductivity and borehole thermal resistance. The TRT is vital for designing ground source heat pumps and seasonal thermal energy storage (STES) systems. A TRT is an indirect (in-situ) measurement method which is the simplest and most exact way to determine precise thermal properties (Gehlin 2002). Thermal response tests were first suggested by Mogensen (1983) at an international conference in Stockholm. Mogensen suggested a simple arrangement in which heat at constant power is injected into (or extracted from) a borehole while the borehole mean temperature is measured.

== Equipment ==
The system consists of a borehole, pipe system, circulation pump, a chiller or heater with constant power rate, and continuous logging of the inlet and outlet temperatures of the heat carrier fluid. The equipment is normally contained within a single unit for ease of transport and efficient use. The thermal response data (i.e. temperature development in the borehole at a certain energy injection/extraction) allows estimation of the effective thermal conductivity of the ground and the thermal resistance of the borehole.

== Recommendations ==
In order to fulfil the TRT properly, the following recommendations should be considered (Gehlin, 2002, Sanner et al., 2005 and Kharseh):

- Use a power load as steady as possible,
- Monitor the development of the inlet and outlet temperature of the borehole,
- The duration of the test is a minimum of 50 hours.

Traditional response tests apply a constant heat flux to the pumped water, however the newer "constant temperature" method, which holds the outflow water at a constant temperature, has been shown to have many advantages, including shortening the test period and in improving the operating stability and test accuracy.

== Preparation ==
Before the test is started, the undisturbed ground temperature must be determined. This can be measured in various ways: e.g., by temperature loggings of the borehole or by measuring the temperature of the circulated water through the borehole without heating over 20–30 minutes. The mean fluid temperature corresponds to the undisturbed mean temperature along the borehole. The next step is to switch on the heater and the monitoring system. During the test, the heat transfer into the ground surrounding the borehole is essentially radial and relatively constant along the borehole.
