= Tinnitus retraining therapy =

Form of habituation therapy for tinnitus

- Other names: TRT
- Specialty: Audiologist

Tinnitus retraining therapy (TRT) is a form of habituation therapy designed to help people who experience tinnitus—a ringing, buzzing, hissing, or other sound heard when no external sound source is present. Two key components of TRT directly follow from the neurophysiological model of tinnitus: Directive counseling aims to help the sufferer reclassify tinnitus to a category of neutral signals, and sound therapy weakens tinnitus-related neuronal activity.

The goal of TRT is to allow a person to manage their reaction to their tinnitus: habituating themselves to it, and restoring unaffected perception. Neither Tinnitus Retraining Therapy or any other therapy reduces or eliminates tinnitus.

An alternative to TRT is tinnitus masking: the use of noise, music, or other environmental sounds to obscure or mask the tinnitus. Hearing aids can partially mask the condition. A review of tinnitus retraining therapy trials indicates that it may be more effective than tinnitus masking.

== Applicability ==
Not everyone who experiences tinnitus is significantly bothered by it. However, some experience annoyance, anxiety, panic, loss of sleep, or difficulty concentrating. The distress of tinnitus is strongly associated with various psychological factors; the loudness, duration, and other characteristics of the tinnitus symptoms are secondary.

TRT may offer real though moderate improvement in tinnitus suffering for adults with moderate-to-severe tinnitus, in the absence of hyperacusis, significant hearing loss, or depression. Not everyone is a good candidate for TRT. Those most likely to have a favorable outcome from TRT are those with lower loudness of tinnitus, higher pitch of tinnitus, shorter duration of tinnitus since onset, recognition of tinnitus attenuation by sound generator, lower hearing thresholds (i.e. better hearing), high Tinnitus Handicap Inventory (THI) score, and positive attitude toward therapy.

=== Other secondary hearing symptoms ===
Although no studies have concluded in its optimal treatment, TRT has been used to treat hyperacusis, misophonia, and phonophobia.

== Cause ==
=== Physiological basis ===
Tinnitus may be the result of abnormal neural activity caused by discordant damage (dysfunction) of outer and inner hair cells of the cochlea.

=== Psychological model ===
The psychological basis for TRT is the hypothesis that the brain can change how it processes auditory stimuli. TRT is imputed to work by interfering with the neural activity causing the tinnitus at its source, in order to prevent it from spreading to other parts of the nervous systems such as the limbic and autonomic nervous systems.

== Methodologies ==
The full TRT program lasts 12 to 24 months and consists of an initial classification of clients for different emphasis during therapy, then a combination of directed counseling and sound therapy.

=== Classification ===
Clients are classified into five categories, numbered 0 to 4, based on whether or not the patient has tinnitus with hearing loss, tinnitus with no hearing loss, tinnitus with hearing loss and hyperacusis, and tinnitus with hearing loss and hyperacusis for an extended amount of time.

=== Counseling ===
The first component of TRT, directive counseling, may change the way tinnitus is perceived. The patient is taught basic knowledge about the auditory system and its function, and how tinnitus and the annoyance associated with tinnitus is generated. The repetition of these points in follow-up visits helps the patient come to perceive the tinnitus signal as a non-danger.

=== Sound therapy ===
The second component of TRT uses a sound generator to partially mask the tinnitus. This is done with a device similar to a hearing aid that emits a low level broadband noise so that the ear can hear both the noise and tinnitus. This is intended to acclimate the brain to reducing its emphasis on the tinnitus versus the external sound.

One study found that a full tinnitus masker was just as effective as partial masking, nullifying a key component of habituation therapy. Other review studies have found no value to the sound therapy component of TRT.

== Efficacy ==
Confounding factors make it difficult to measure the efficacy of TRT: tinnitus reporting is entirely subjective, varies over time, and repeated evaluations are not consistent. Researchers note there is a large placebo component to tinnitus management. In many commercial TRT practices, there is a large proportion of dropouts; reported "success" ratios may not take these subjects into account.

There are few available studies, but most show that tinnitus naturally declines over a period of years in a large proportion of subjects surveyed, without any treatment. The annoyance of tinnitus also tends to decline over time. In some people, tinnitus spontaneously disappears.

A Cochrane review found only one sufficiently rigorous study of TRT and noted that while the study suggested benefit in the treatment of tinnitus, the study quality was not good enough to draw firm conclusions. A separate Cochrane review of sound therapy (they called it "masking"), an integral part of TRT, found no convincing evidence of the efficacy of sound therapy in the treatment of tinnitus.

A summary in The Lancet concluded that in the only good study, TRT was more effective than masking; in another study in which TRT was used as a control, TRT showed a small benefit. A study that compared cognitive behavior therapy (CBT) in combination with the counselling part of TRT versus standard care (ENT, audiologist, maskers, hearing aid) found that the specialized care had a positive effect on quality of life as well as on specific tinnitus metrics.

== Clinical practice ==
Tinnitus activities treatment (TAT) is a clinical adaptation of TRT that focuses on four areas: thoughts and emotions, hearing and communication, sleep, and concentration.

Progressive tinnitus management (PTM) is a five-step structured clinical protocol for management of tinnitus that may include tinnitus retraining therapy. The five steps are:

1. triage – determining appropriate referral, i.e. audiology, ENT, emergency medical intervention, or mental health evaluation;
2. audiologic evaluation of hearing loss, tinnitus, hyperacusis, and other symptoms;
3. group education about causes and management of tinnitus;
4. interdisciplinary evaluation of tinnitus;
5. individual management of tinnitus.

The U.S. Department of Veterans Affairs (VA) now employs PTM to help patients self-manage their tinnitus.

== Research ==
- Sound therapy for tinnitus may be more effective if the sound is patterned (i.e. varying in frequency or amplitude) rather than static.
- For people with severe or disabling tinnitus, techniques that are minimally surgical, involving magnetic or electrical stimulation of areas of the brain that are involved in auditory processing, may suppress tinnitus.
- Notched music therapy, in which ordinary music is altered by a one octave notch filter centered at the tinnitus frequency, may reduce tinnitus.

== Alternatives ==
=== Cognitive behavioral therapy ===
Cognitive behavioral therapy (CBT), the counselling part of TRT, as a generalized type of psychological and behavioral counselling, has also been used by itself in the management of tinnitus.

=== Hearing aids ===
If tinnitus is associated with hearing loss, a tuned hearing aid that amplifies sound in the frequency range of the hearing loss (usually the high frequencies) may effectively mask tinnitus by raising the level of environmental sound, in addition to the benefit of restoring hearing.

=== Masking ===
White noise generators or environmental music may provide a background noise level that is of sufficient amplitude that it wholly or partially "masks" the tinnitus. Composite hearing aids that combine amplification and white noise generation are also available.

=== Other ===
Numerous non-TRT methods have been suggested for the treatment or management of tinnitus.

- pharmacological – No drug has been approved by the U.S. Food and Drug Administration (FDA) for treating tinnitus. However, various pharmacological treatments, including antidepressants, anxiolytics, vasodilators and vasoactive substances, and intravenous lidocaine have been prescribed for tinnitus
- lifestyle and support – Loud noise, alcohol, caffeine, nicotine, quiet environments, and psychological conditions like stress and depression may exacerbate tinnitus. Reducing or controlling these may help manage the condition.
- alternative medicine – Vitamin, antioxidant, and herbal preparations (notably Ginkgo biloba extract, also called EGb761) are advertised as treatments or cures for tinnitus. None are approved by the FDA, and controlled clinical trials on their efficacy are lacking.

== See also ==
- Operant conditioning
- Safe listening
- Hearing loss

== Literature ==
- Henry; et al. (2007). Tinnitus Retraining Therapy: Clinical Guidelines. San Diego, Plural Publishing, Inc.
- Henry; et al. (2007). Tinnitus Retraining Therapy: Patient Counseling Guide. San Diego, Plural Publishing, Inc.
