= Glossary of geothermal heating and cooling =

The Glossary of Geothermal Heating and Cooling provides definitions of many terms used within the Geothermal heat pump industry. The terms in this glossary may be used by industry professionals, for education materials, and by the general public.

== A ==
=== Active Borehole Length ===
The length of the U-bend in the borehole below the header trench (usually 4 to 6 feet less than the total borehole length from the surface).

=== Advanced Geothermal System (AGS) ===
See Closed-Loop Geothermal System entry.

=== Ambient Air ===
The surrounding air (usually outdoor air or the air in a specific location).

=== Ambient Ground Temperature ===
The natural temperature of the earth in a specific location. This temperature will typically be quite stable at a depth of 30' (9 m) and is usually close to the annual average air temperature of the area and is influenced primarily by the average air temperature and secondarily by the thermal energy absorbed from the sun. While the ambient ground temperature is constant, as heat is extracted or rejected via the ground heat exchanger (GHX), the temperature will vary. Typically, a GHX is designed to operate at a minimum fluid temperature of about 32°F (0°C) and a maximum fluid temperature of 90°F (32°C)

=== Annual Ground Load ===
Defined to be the difference between the annual amount of heat rejected to the GHEX in the cooling mode and the annual amount of heat extracted from the GHEX in the heating mode.

=== Antifreeze ===
A variety of Antifreeze solutions are used in geothermal ground loops. The most common types are: Propylene glycol, Methanol, and Ethanol

=== As-Built Drawing ===
A detailed drawing that shows everything included on the site plan in addition to the exact location, dimensions, and other pertinent details for a given GHEX installation after the installation is complete.

=== Auxiliary Heat ===
A supplemental source of heating to provide additional heat to assist a geothermal heating and cooling system. Auxiliary heat can also be used as back-up emergency heat if heat pump goes into fault.

=== Average Efficiency ===
Seasonal average versus peak Energy Efficiency Ratio (EER) or coefficient of performance (COP).

== B ==
=== Balance Point Temperature ===
The outdoor air temperatures where internal heat gains from people, appliances, etc. offset the envelope heat loss to the atmosphere. It is at the balance point temperatures where no indoor heating or cooling will be required to maintain the temperature of the home at the thermostat set point.

=== Bend ===
A fitting either molded separately or formed from pipe for the purpose of accommodating a directional change.

=== Bentonite Grout ===
A common grout mix used to protect aquifers from ground or cross contamination and ensure good contact between loop and surrounding soil.

=== Best Practice ===
Commonly accepted practices among industry professionals.

=== Bin ===
In the bin method, a temperature increment, usually 5 F, into which the range of temperatures for an area are divided. Bins are used to produce a frequency distribution of hourly, monthly, or annual outdoor temperature occurrences for a specified location.

=== Bleed ===
Discharge of water from a standing column well to maintain desired temperatures

=== Block Load ===
Defined to be the sum of the zone loads. A block load calculation is necessary for a building with multiple zones served by a centralized heating/cooling system.

=== Blowers ===
Fans used to force air across the heat exchanger. With a ground source heat pump, the only blower used is to force air through the central heating system.

=== Brine ===
A mixture of water and antifreeze

=== Buffer Tank ===
A storage tank for geo conditioned water

=== Building Management System ===
A computerized or digital control system that controls many or all of the systems in a building, including the HVAC system, lighting system, building access controls, etc.

== C ==
=== Centralized Pumping System ===
Flow centers located centrally in a ground source system that produce flow to all heat pump units in that system.

=== Circulating Pump(s) ===
The pump(s) that circulates the fluid in the closed-loop system during normal operation.

=== Closed-Loop Ground Source Heat Pump ===
The heat exchange loop in a Ground Source Heat Pump (GSHP) system that consists of the ground heat exchanger, the circulating pump, and the water-source heat pump in which the heat transfer fluid is not exposed to the atmosphere.

=== Closed-Loop Geothermal System ===
A subsurface circuit of wellbores containing a fluid heated by a geothermal hot rock resource, without direct contact of the fluid with the resource. Unlike the closed loop in a Ground Source Heat Pump, which is used for small-scale residential heating and cooling, Closed-Loop Geothermal Systems are used for utility-scale energy production (typically >1 megawatt). A Closed-Loop Geothermal System is sometimes referred to as an Advanced Geothermal System (AGS).

=== Coaxial Heat Exchanger ===
A tube in tube heat exchanger where water (or brine) is separated from refrigerant.

=== Coefficient of Performance ===
A measure of heat pump efficiency. It is calculated by dividing the heating or cooling output of a heat pump (in BTUs/hr) and dividing it by the energy input (converted to BTUs/hr).

=== Coil ===
A heat exchanger used to transfer energy from one source to another. In ground source heat pumps, water-to-refrigerant and refrigerant-to-air coils are used.

=== Combination GSHP Unit ===
A GSHP that has the ability to heat or cool air at full capacity or to heat or cool water at full capacity, but not both at the same time.

=== Condenser ===
A heat exchanger in which hot, pressurized (gaseous) refrigerant is condensed by transferring heat to cooler surrounding air, water, or earth.

=== Compressor ===
The central component of a heat pump system. The compressor increases the pressure of a refrigerant fluid, and simultaneously reduces its volume, while causing the fluid to move through the system.

== D ==
=== Deep Earth Temperatures ===
Relatively constant temperature at a given depth which vary when heat is extracted or rejected by ground loops.

=== Degree Day ===
A measure of the severity and duration of an outdoor temperature deviation above or below a fixed temperature (65 F), used in estimating the heating or cooling requirement and fuel consumption of a building for either summer or winter conditions.

=== Delta P ===
Difference in pressure between two test points

=== Delta T ===
Temperature difference between two test sites such as supply and return air or entering and leaving water in ground loop.

=== Demand (DMD) ===
The electrical input required to operate a GSHP unit for space conditioning.

=== Design Loop Temperatures ===
Temperatures that the ground loop is designed to stay above during the heating mode and below during cooling mode.

=== Design Outdoor Temperature ===
Outdoor air temperatures that coincides with the peak seasonal heating or cooling load.

=== Design Loads ===
The peak heating or cooling load used to select the equipment for a system (such as a heat pump) and to design the air distribution system (supply air diffusers, return air grilles, and the duct system). Design loads are based on standard or accepted conditions for a given locality (a design day).

=== Design Temperature, Summer ===
A specific temperature used in calculating the cooling load of a building. The summer design temperature is typically the outdoor air temperature that is exceeded 0.4% or 1.0% of the time.

=== Design Temperature, Winter ===
A specific temperature used in calculating the heating load of a building. The winter design temperature is typically the outdoor temperature that is exceeded 99.0% or 99.6% of the time.

=== Desuperheater ===
A device for recovering superheat from the compressor discharge gas of a heat pump or central air conditioner for use in heating or preheating water. Also known as a heat recovery water heater.

=== Dimension Ratio (DR) ===
A specific ratio of the average specified outside diameter to the minimum specified wall thickness (OD/t) for outside-diameter controlled plastic pipe.

=== Direct Expansion (DX) Earth-Coupled Heat Pump ===
A heat pump system in which the refrigerant is circulated in pipes buried underground.

=== Distributed Pumping System ===
A system made up of smaller, individual pumping stations (one flow center for each heat pump) each controlled individually by the operation of the specific heat pump unit that they serve.

=== Dual Circuit GSHP Unit ===
A GSHP which utilizes two compressors (generally of different capacities) connected to two refrigeration circuits to allow multiple modes of operation. This unit may use one compressor in heating or cooling of ducted air only, one compressor to heat water only, one compressor heating or cooling air while the other is heating water, or both compressors either heating or cooling air.

== E ==
=== Efficiency ===
A measure of the useful output of a system divided by the input required to drive the system.

=== Energy Efficiency Ratio (EER) ===
A measure of cooling efficiency for heat pump equipment, expressed as the cooling energy removed from the space (Btu) divided by the electric energy consumed to provide that cooling (W).

=== Energy Loads ===
Used in predicting the energy necessary to operate the system for some prescribed time such as a month, year, or season. The calculation methodology may be the same as for the design load; however, the actual operating and weather data are used instead of design conditions.

=== Energy Model ===
A detailed heat loss and heat gain calculation for a building. The calculation takes into account heat transfer to and from the space inside the building to the outside air. It takes into account the construction of the building walls and roof, including insulation values, mass of the structure, orientation of the different components to the sun, color of the material. An 8,760 hourly model is used to calculate the heat loss/gain based on the historical average temperature data (usually 20 years) for the building location. The modeler then overlays building occupancy schedules, lighting schedules, ventilation, etc. to account for internal heat gains, heat losses and gains from the mechanical system, etc. in detail, on a room by room basis. The software than calculates the actual heating and cooling loads required for every hour of the year. The detailed energy analysis allows us to calculate the energy consumption per day, month or year. This can be translated into energy cost based on local utility rates. It also allows us to calculate energy transfer to and from the GHX and size the system accurately.

=== Emergency Heat ===
A backup heat source that is activated if heat pump shuts off. The most common form of emergency heat is electric resistance.

=== Entering Water Temperature (EWT) ===
The temperature of the water entering the heat pump from the ground loop heat exchanger. Systems are designed so that the entering water temperature does not fall below the Minimum Entering Water Temperature during heating or rise above the Maximum Entering Water Temperature during cooling. Entering water temperature has a significant effect on heat pump operating efficiency.

=== Equipment Loads ===
Loads served by the heating/cooling system that are not included in peak heating/ cooling block load calculations. These loads include duct and hydronic piping losses/gains as well as ventilation loads.

=== Evaporator ===
A heat exchanger in which cold, low-pressure (liquid) refrigerant is vaporized to absorb heat from the warmer surrounding air, earth, or water.

=== Expansion Valve ===
A device that reduces the pressure of liquid refrigerant entering the evaporator and meters and regulates the flow of refrigerant so that it can properly absorb heat.

== F ==
=== Fan Coil ===
A water or refrigerant coil through which air is circulated for conditioning

=== Finish Tank ===
Water heater downstream of a buffer tank

=== Flow Center ===
A packaged set of circulating pumps mounted in a cabinet, which often includes valves and ports for flushing/purging, antifreeze charging (if used), and loop pressurization (if a pressurized flow center is used).

=== Flow Meter ===
A device that indicates water flow (often in gallons per minute)

=== Flow Rater ===
Component that reduces fluid flow to a specified rate (such as 4 gpm).

=== Fluid Factor ===
A factor, F, used in calculating geoexchange rate, G, in BTUs/hr.

G = F ΔT Q

where ΔT is in °F and Q is gallons per minute.
For water, F is approximately 500. For antifreeze solutions, F is approximately 485.

=== Flush Cart ===
A system which integrates the purge pump with the valving, hose connections, electrical connections, filtration, and reservoir tank on a hand cart for maximum portability and ease of use during operation. Flush carts fabricated for residential or light commercial use will typically utilize high-head, high-volume purge pumps from 1-1/2 hp to 3 hp in size.

=== Flow Regime ===
The nature of fluid flow in any situation. Flow regime can either be regarded as laminar, transitional, or turbulent.

=== Flushing Velocity ===
Velocity of fluid (often stated in feet/second) required to force air out of any pipe in a ground loop heat exchanger, generally accepted minimum is 2 feet/sec.

=== Forced Air ===
System that conditions a space by circulating air through a heat exchanger or fan coil

=== Fossil Fuel System ===
A home heating system that uses natural gas, liquid propane or fuel oil.

=== Fusion ===
Method of joining loop pipes together. Most common are socket fusion, butt fusion or electro fusion.

== G ==
=== Gauge Pressure ===
Pressure reading directly taken from a pressure sensor or gauge (psi).

=== GeoExchange System ===
A system that utilizes renewable thermal energy in the shallow subsurface to extract or reject heat.

=== Geo Stab ===
Fusionless loop fittings

=== Ground Coupled Heat Pump ===
See Ground Source Heat Pump

=== GHX Circuit ===
Most GHX's (ground heat exchangers) are designed and built with one or more "supply and return runout pipe pairs". Connected to the runout pipe pairs are 2 or more GHX circuits that are installed in vertical boreholes, horizontal trenches or submerged in bodies of water. The GHX circuits are the primary heat exchange surface areas that absorb heat from the ground or water or reject heat to it.

=== Geothermal Heat Pump ===
A refrigeration-based system that extracts or rejects heat (BTUs) from an open or closed loop system

=== Ground loop ===
See Ground Heat Exchanger.

=== Ground Heat Exchanger (GHX) ===
A heat exchanger buried in the ground around or under a building. Typically it is built by burying a continuous coil of high-density polyethylene (HDPE) or cross linked polyethylene (PEX) pipe in the ground. The pipe can be buried in excavated trenches 4' to 10' (1.3 to 3 m) deep, inserted into horizontal or vertical boreholes, or laid in the bottom of a pond, lake or the ocean.

=== Ground Loads ===
Associated with ground source systems and related to the design of the GHEX. In principle, these calculations are similar to the energy loads except the ground load is heat rejected to the ground (cooling mode) or removed from it (heating mode).

=== Ground Source Heat Pump (GSHP) ===
A heat pump system that uses the ground as a heat source and/or heat sink.

In a closed loop system, the heat exchanger is typically coils of high-density polyethylene pipe installed in the ground under or around a building. A heat transfer fluid, usually water or water mixed with antifreeze (propylene glycol, ethanol or methanol), is circulated through this pipe, warming or cooling to the temperature of the earth or rock around it.

In open loop systems the pipe draws water from a well, lake or pond. After it is warmed or cooled the water is returned via a discharge well or back to the lake or pond.

The fluid from the open or closed loop is circulated through a heat pump. The refrigerant in the heat pump either extracts heat from the fluid or rejects heat to it, cooling or warming the refrigerant. When heat is absorbed by the refrigerant, the heat pump boosts its temperature and sends it to the air handler to circulate hot air to heat the home and (optionally) to a hot water heater to produce domestic hot water. The now cooled fluid goes back into the closed loop or, in an open loop system, is sent back to its source.

When the heat pump cools the building, the air handler transfers the heat to the heat pump's refrigerant, warming it and the heat transfer fluid. The now heated fluid circulates back into the closed loop for cooling back to the ambient ground temperature. In an open loop system is sent to the discharge well or back into the lake or pond.

=== Grout ===
A material used during the grouting process specifically designed to form a hydraulic barrier in the borehole and to promote transfer between the GHEX piping and the earth. Most grouting products are bentonite-based with fewer being cement-based.

=== Grouting ===
The practice of making a conscious effort to form a hydraulic barrier in a borehole to protect the integrity of the deep earth environment. Proper grouting implies that an approved grouting material is used and that it is placed in the hole starting through a tremie line, filling it from bottom to top.

== H ==
=== Header ===
A manifold that joins parallel loops to a common header pipe

=== Heat Energy ===
Thermal energy (often measured in BTUs) that is transferred from and to ground loop with the heat pump.

=== Heat Exchanger ===
A device, often a coil, specifically designed to transfer heat between two physically separated fluids of different temperatures.

=== Heat of extraction (HE) ===
Thermal energy removed from the ground loop and provided to the building during heating mode. This is commonly referred to as geoexchange and is recognized as renewable thermal energy. Commonly expressed in BTU/hr

=== Heat of Extraction ===
The portion of a GSHP's heating capacity that is extracted from the earth in the heating mode. Heat of extraction is always smaller than the heating capacity of the heat pump because the electrical power consumption of the compressor, fan, and pumps add to the heating capacity of the GSHP.

=== Heat Fusion ===
Making a joint by heating the mating surfaces of the pipe components to be joined and pressing them together so that they fuse and become essentially one piece.

=== Heat Gain ===
When cooling a building the heat gain is the amount of btus a system must be able to reject elsewhere

=== Heat Load ===
Heat load is a calculation that identifies both the heat gain and the heat loss

=== Heat Loss ===
When heating a building the heat loss is the total number of btus that a system needs to extract from elsewhere or produce through combustion or resistance

=== Heat Pump ===
A mechanical device used for heating and cooling which operates by moving heat energy from one location to another (generally for comfort conditioning). Heat pumps can draw from or discharge heat to air, water, or earth, and are most often either air source or water source.

=== Heat of rejection (HR) ===
The amount of heat that must be rejected to the earth in the cooling mode to provide cooling to the space. The heat of rejection is always larger than the cooling capacity of the heat pump because the electrical power consumption of the compressor, fan, and pumps must also be rejected to the heat sink (ground connection).

=== Heating, Ventilation and Air-Conditioning System ===
A building system designed to maintain the required temperature and air quality in occupied spaces in a building. It includes equipment that provides heating and cooling to the distribution system, which delivers this conditioned air to all parts of a building, as well as adequate air quality by ventilating and filtering the air. Often referred to as "HVAC."

=== Heat Sink ===
The medium—air, water, earth, etc.—which receives heat from a heat pump.

=== Heat Source ===
The medium—air, water, earth, etc.—from which heat is extracted by a heat pump.

=== Heating Seasonal Performance Factor (HSPF) ===
A measure of heating efficiency for air source heat pump equipment on an annual basis, expressed as the heating energy provided to the space (Btu) divided by the electric energy consumed (Watt-hour) over the entire heating season.

=== Heat Transfer Resistance ===
A system's resistance to heat flow resulting from the specific thermal properties and dimensions of the system.

=== Horizontal loop ===
See description here

=== Hybrid System ===
For residential systems, this typically refers to package units that can provide space heating and domestic hot water. In commercial applications, this typically refers to systems that consist of multiple types of heating/cooling systems.

=== Hydronic ===
A heating or cooling distribution system using liquid piped throughout the house to radiators or convectors.

== I ==
=== Inhibitor ===
A fluid additive specifically designed to decrease the rate of oxidation in metal (rust) and promotion of microbial life (bacteria) in the closed-loop circulating fluid.

=== Integrated Design Process (IDP) ===
A process used when designing a building in which all of the stakeholders in a project work closely together in an attempt to achieve the most efficient building and system possible. As an example, a lighting designer may determine that the energy cost savings from installing more efficient lighting in a building is not very cost-effective because the electricity saved by the lighting will not pay for the additional cost of installing the lights for more than 30 years...and would normally recommend against installing the lighting. But, when the reduced heat gain from more efficient lighting is taken into account, the capacity of the cooling system can be reduced enough to pay for the more efficient lighting, and savings resulting from both the lighting and cooling system are taken into account, it results in an overall saving for the owner.

=== Internal Gains ===
In load calculations internal gains are things that contribute heat in a building such as lighting and other appliances.

== J ==
=== Joint ===
The location at which two pieces of pipe or a pipe and a fitting are connected.

== L ==
=== Laminar Flow ===
Fluid that flows in static layers with no intermixing. See Laminar flow

=== Latent Cooling Load ===
The amount of moisture that must be removed to the space at the desired humidity level.

=== Latent Heat ===
The thermal energy required for water to make a phase change from vapor (humidity) to liquid (water condensate that runs down the drain) or liquid to solid (ice). See Latent heat

=== Loop System ===
The ground heat exchange for a heat pump. It is either open or closed loop.

== M ==
=== Manual J ===
Among the most common load calculation formula.

=== Maximum EWT ===
In loop field design, the maximum entering water temperature is what you size your loops not to exceed during the cooling season

=== Minimum EWT ===
In loop field design the minimum entering water temperature (from the GHX) permitted throughout the heating season

=== Methanol ===
Commonly used antifreeze. See Methanol

=== Monitoring System ===
Monitoring systems in the context of a geothermal system are used to monitor efficiency and operation. Some also give notices for maintenance such as filter changes and alerts for trouble such as excessive auxiliary use. This system could be linked to the internet for remote monitoring, could be in the form of an electric meter, an hour counter or a web based monitor or thermostat.

=== Multi-pipe Trench ===
A horizontal loop generally consisting of 2, 4 or 6 pipes. Pipes may be pinned to trench walls for separation or may have one course on the bottom of the trench and a second course after a foot or two of backfill.

=== Multi-source heat pump ===
A heat pump with access to more than one source/sink element of thermal energy. Common elements include, ground, solar, air, biomass, waste heat. Often applied with a thermal battery or thermal energy storage devices.

== N ==
=== Non-Pressurized Flow Center ===
A flow center that maintains a flow of water into the suction side of the pump (maintaining a flooded volute and reliable pump operation) by having the pump located directly adjacent to a column of water (in a canister). As a result, the system can operate at "zero" or atmospheric pressure. Thus the term "non-pressurized" simply means a device that allows for reliable pump operation without the need to elevate the system pressure (typically 20-60 psig for pressurized systems). Non-pressurized does not mean that the system is open to the atmosphere, but simply a closed sealed system that operates at atmospheric pressure.

== O ==
=== Open Loop ===
A system using water from a well, lake or pond that is discharged to a drain, re-injected into a return well or returned to the same well, lake or pond it was extracted from.

== P ==
=== P/T Port ===
Generally at or close to where water or brine enters and leaves the geothermal unit, a P/T port is an opening where one may insert a gauge to measure pressure (P) or temperature (T).

=== Package System ===
In geothermal terms, a self-contained forced water to air system. Both the refrigeration and air handling systems are in one unit.

=== Passive Solar ===
A system that extracts heat energy from the sun through an intermediary. In the context of geothermal, the sun warms the earth and the loop system collects that solar energy for space conditioning.

=== Percent of Load ===
In the geothermal context the percent of load is usually the amount of seasonal btus provided by each of the geothermal stages. This is not the same than a percentage of the actual heat loss/gain. Peak loads happen infrequently so 98% of the seasonal load might be 60% of peak the peak load.

=== Performance Factor ===
The ratio of useful output capacity of a system to the input required to obtain it. Units of capacity and input need not be consistent.

=== Pond Loop ===
Loop system placed in a pond or lake instead of buried under ground.

=== Positive Displacement Pump ===
A pump that moves a set volume of fluid through the system for each revolution of the driving shaft. Positive displacement pumps are commonly used in conjunction with highsolids grouting materials.

=== Power Flushing ===
A higher than normal water flow and pressure in a ground heat exchanger used to flush air and debris from the closed-loop piping system.

=== Pressure Drop ===
In geothermal pressure drop most commonly refers to a measurement of entering and leaving water pressures at the unit to determine gallons per minute of flow through the coaxial heat exchanger. In general hydronics including loop fields it is also a factor in design that must be overcome with pumping power to deliver desired GPM.

=== Pressurized Flow Center ===
A flow center that typically consists of circulating pumps mounted in a cabinet. Positive pressure must be maintained on the system at all times (via pressurization of the lines) to ensure positive suction-side pressure on the pumps in order to produce flow.

=== Pressure Rating ===
The estimated maximum pressure that the medium in the pipe can exert continuously with a high degree of certainty that failure of the pipe will not occur.

=== Pump Curve ===
A curve used to display the amount of back pressure (head loss, feet) that a given circulating pump would be able to overcome at a given flow rate, typically provided by the pump manufacturer.

=== Pump and Dump ===
Open loop system adds heat to or removes it from water and then discharges it.

=== Purge Pump ===
A high-pressure and high-flow-rate pump used to flush air and debris from the closed-loop circuit of a closed-loop/ground-source (cl/gs) heat pump system.

== R ==
=== Racetrack ===
Multi pipe trench of generally 2, 4 or 6 pipes

=== Radiant ===
In the context of geothermal, hydronic radiant floors walls or ceilings are one way to deliver/extract heat.

=== Refrigerant ===
A fluid of extremely low boiling point used to transfer heat between the heat source and heat sink. It absorbs heat at low temperature and low pressure and rejects heat at a higher temperature and higher pressure, usually involving changes of state in the fluid (i.e., from liquid to vapor and back).

=== Return (Air) ===
Air returned to the space conditioning unit from the conditioned space.

=== Reversing valve ===
A refrigerant valve that reverses refrigerant flow to determine whether system is heating or cooling

=== Reverse return ===
On closed loop headers the parallel loop that is closest to the heat pump on one header would return farthest from the heat pump on the other.

=== Reynolds number ===
The Reynolds number is used to determine flow conditions in the ground loop heat exchanger. Turbulent flow is desirable as it enhances the heat exchange process.

=== Rule of Thumb ===
An estimate based on limited information. In geothermal "rules of thumb" are generally not considered best practice, especially not for sizing equipment or loopfields.

=== Run Fraction ===
The fraction of time that a GSHP system operates to condition a space for a given period of time, expressed as a decimal.

=== Run Time ===
The number of hours that a GSHP system operates to condition a space for a given period of time.

== S ==
=== Saturated Liquid ===
The temperature and pressure where refrigerant is all liquid, but will immediately begin to evaporate with addition of heat.

=== Saturated Vapor ===
The temperature and pressure where refrigerant is all vapor, but will immediately begin to condense with removal of heat.

=== Saturation Temperature ===
The temperature at which refrigerant will either immediately condense with the removal of heat (if in the vapor phase) or evaporate with the addition of heat (if in the liquid phase) at a given pressure.

=== Scaling ===
The build up of water impurities on the inside surface of the water-to-refrigerant heat exchanger in a GSHP, primarily caused by hardness and alkalinity of the water. This problem occurs primarily in open-loop systems and can cause fouling in the heat exchanger, diminishing the overall effectiveness and efficiency of the system.

=== Schedule ===
A pipe size and wall thickness classification system (outside diameters and wall thicknesses) originated by the iron pipe industry.

=== Seasonal Energy Efficiency Ratio (SEER) ===
A measure of cooling efficiency for air source heat pump equipment on an annual basis, expressed as the cooling energy removed from the space divided by the electric energy consumed over the entire cooling season.

=== Seasonal Performance Factor (SPF) ===
A measure of efficiency for heat pumps on a seasonal basis, based on a specified boundary scheme that specifies which electrical measurements are taken into account in the calculation (e.g., ground loop pump, fan, heat pump controls, backup heaters, etc.). The methodology of calculating the SPF makes it possible to compare the heat pump system with common heating systems like oil or gas. By this comparison it is also possible to calculate the CO2- and primary energy reduction potential from different heat pump systems compared to other heating systems.

=== Sensible Cooling Load ===
The amount of sensible heat that must be removed to maintain the space at the thermostat set point temperature.

=== Sensible Heat ===
Thermal energy required to change the temperature of water or air. See Sensible heat

=== Sensible Heat Factor (SHE) ===
The percentage of the total cooling load that can be attributed to the sensible load. Defined to be sensible cooling load divided by the total load, expressed as a decimal.

=== Series System ===
A system in which the circulating fluid from the heat pump(s) has a single flow path through the ground heat exchanger.

=== Short Looped ===
In geothermal a "short looped" system is one which fails to maintain minimum and maximum entering water temperatures due to inadequate design.

=== Site derived renewable fraction (SDRF) ===
The percentage of total annual energy usage that is derived on site or locally from renewable elements and was not imported into the site. This includes both thermal energy (solar thermal, earth energy, biomass, etc.) as well as electrical energy (photo-voltaics, deep geothermal, hydro-electric, etc.)

=== Site Plan ===
A detailed drawing that shows where buildings, buried utilities, landscaping, permanent fencing, etc. are located on a property and also where a potential GHEX could be installed.

=== Slinky loop ===
A type of loop that is coiled much like a flattened child's toy of the same name. Generally laid flat in the bottom of a trench, vertical slinkies have been used as well.

=== Solenoid ===
Mechanical device used for a variety of functions, including interrupting flow of water when an open loop system is not running.

=== Soil/Field Resistance ===
The resistance to heat flow resulting from soil thermal properties and underground pipe placement.

=== Split System ===
A heat pump that has an air handler and fan coil separate from the refrigeration components

=== Standing Column Well (SCW) ===
An open loop system that returns water from the geothermal, into the same well it was extracted from. Usually a designer includes a bleed off to keep from adding or extracting too much heat. Bleed water is replaced by fresh water from the aquifer the SCW is drawing from.

=== Supplemental Heating ===
A heating system component used when a heat pump cannot satisfy the space heating requirements by itself, during the defrost cycle (for air source equipment only), or as an emergency backup when the main system is inoperable. Usually electric resistance heat, but natural gas, LPG, or oil heating systems are also used.

== T ==
=== Temperature Lift ===
The difference in temperature between the heat source a heat pump is connected to and the temperature that is being produced is referred to as the temperature lift. For example, if a heat pump is extracting heat from heat transfer fluid in a GHX that is 40°F (4.4°C) and is rejecting heat to water that is 120°F (49°C), the temperature lift is 80°F (44.6°C)

=== Therm ===
A quantity of heat equivalent to 100,000 Btu.

=== Thermal Conductivity ===
Measure of the ability of the ground to conduct thermal energy. See Thermal conductivity.

=== Thermal Conductivity Test ===
A thermal conductivity test measures the ability of the soil or rock a heat exchanger is buried in to transfer energy. To conduct a thermal conductivity test (TC test) of a vertical borehole, HDPE pipe is installed in a borehole to the depth that is most appropriate for the site and building loads. Heated water is circulated through the pipe. It is typically heated using electric elements powered by a generator. The flow rate and temperature of the water is measured as it enters and leaves the borehole. The test is typically operated for at least 48 hours. Flow rate and temperature data are recorded usually every 2 minutes. This is used to calculate the thermal properties of the borehole to determine how much heat can be rejected to or extracted from the borehole. This is used in conjunction with the building energy loads to calculate the number, spacing and depth of the boreholes for a proposed GCHP system.

=== Thermal Energy Storage ===
Tanks or devices used to store thermal energy. This can include tanks to store chilled water or ice (cold storage) or tanks used to store hot water or a variety of phase change materials (was, eutectic salts, rock, concrete or thermal mass, etc.). Energy can also be stored in earth surrounding the piping of a GHX field.

=== Thermally Enhanced Grout ===
High performance grout with a greater TC than more commonly used products

=== Throttling Valve ===
Most commonly used to restrict flow between desuperheaters and buffer tanks, throttling valves allow an operator to achieve higher delta T between entering and leaving water by slowing the GPM flow.

=== Ton of Refrigeration ===
A measure of the amount of heat absorption required to melt I ton of ice in 24 hours. A ton of refrigeration is a measure of the amount of cooling delivered by a heat pump (or other air conditioning system). One ton of refrigeration is equivalent to a cooling rate of 12,000 Btu per hour.

=== Total Cooling Load ===
The total amount of heat energy that must be removed from a space to keep it at the thermostat set point temperature as well as at the desired humidity level, defined to be the sum of the sensible cooling load and the latent cooling load.

=== Tremie Line ===
The pipe used to pump an appropriate grouting material into a borehole from the bottom of the hole to the top. A tremie line will commonly be made of I-inch or I-IL-inch diameter HDPE pipe.

=== Turbulent Flow Regime ===
The flow condition where fluid flow becomes chaotic and disordered. The mixing effect caused by turbulent flow maximizes heat transfer between the fluid and pipe walls in the closed-loop GHEX while also increasing the system pumping pressure.

== U ==
=== Ubend ===
A plastic pipe assembly consisting of 2 lengths of plastic pipe (HDPE or PEX-a) joined at one end by a molded plastic U-bend. The U-tube is inserted into a vertical or horizontal borehole. In most cases bentonite and/or cement grout fills the annular space inside the borehole around the U-tube piping. Heat transfer fluid is circulated through the U-tube and through a heat pump. When there is a difference in the temperature of the heat transfer fluid and the earth and/or rock surrounding the U-tube piping, energy is transferred to or from the ground.

=== Unitary Heat Pump ===
A complete factory-assembled heat pump.

== V ==
=== Valve, Expansion ===
A device for regulating the flow of liquid refrigerant to the evaporator. Two types of valves are commonly used: an electronic valve that responds to variation in electric resistance reflecting changes in refrigerant temperature, and a thermostatic valve that uses a refrigerant-filled bulb to sense changes in refrigerant temperature.

=== Valve, Reversing ===
An electrically operated valve that allows the heat pump to switch from heating to cooling, or vice versa, by changing the refrigerant's direction of flow.

=== Variable refrigerant flow ===
The next generation in technology that allows a compressor to only use what is required to satisfy demand versus multi-stage or single stage systems that sometimes use more energy that is required

=== Vertical loop ===
A ground loop oriented in the vertical direction, commonly in one or more vertical boreholes.

=== Vorizontal Loop ===
Generally installed by a directional boring machine this loop travels both horizontally and vertically.

== W ==
=== Water Source Heat Pump ===
A heat pump that uses a water-to-refrigerant heat exchanger to extract heat from the heat source.

=== Water Source Heat Pump, Closed Loop ===
Closed-loop systems circulate a heat transfer fluid (such as water or a water-antifreeze mixture) continuously to extract or reject heat from a ground or water heat source or sink.

=== Water Source Heat Pump, Open Loop ===
Open-loop systems pump groundwater or surface water from a well, river, or lake through a water-to-refrigerant heat exchanger and return the water to its source, a drainage basin, pond, or storm sewer.

=== Water to Air ===
A heat pump that transfers thermal energy from ground loop (water) and distributes through building via air ducts.

=== Water to Water ===
A heat pump that transfers thermal energy from ground loop (water) and distributes through building via a hydronic (water) system.

== X ==
=== X ===
Exchange/Exchanger. Shorthand i.e. GHX, DX, HX.

== Z ==
=== Zone Load ===
The amount of heating or cooling that the delivery system must provide to satisfy the peak loads for a specific zone, and a single thermostat is used to control the delivery system for that zone.

== Acronyms ==
Acronym	–
COP	Coefficient of Performance
DHW	Domestic Hot Water
DP	Delta P or Pressure Difference
DT	Delta T or Temperature Difference
DX	Direct Exchange
EAT	Entering Air Temperature
EER	Energy Efficiency Ratio
EWT	Entering Water Temperature
EWP	Entering Water Pressure
GHP	Geothermal Heat Pump (same as GSHP)
GSHP	Ground Source Heat Pump (same as GHP)
GHX	Ground Heat Exchanger
HDPE	High-density polyethylene
IGSHPA	International Ground Source Heat Pump Association
LAT	Leaving Air Temperature
LWT	Leaving Water Temperature
LWP	Leaving Water Pressure
MSHP	Multi-source Heat Pump
SCW	Standing Column Well
SPF	Seasonal Performance Factor
TC	Thermal Conductivity
VFD	Variable Frequency Drive
VRF	Variable Refrigerant Flow
WSHP	Water Source Heat Pump
WTA	Water to Air
WTW	Water to Water
