= The Antlers discography =

Discography of American indie rock band the Antlers

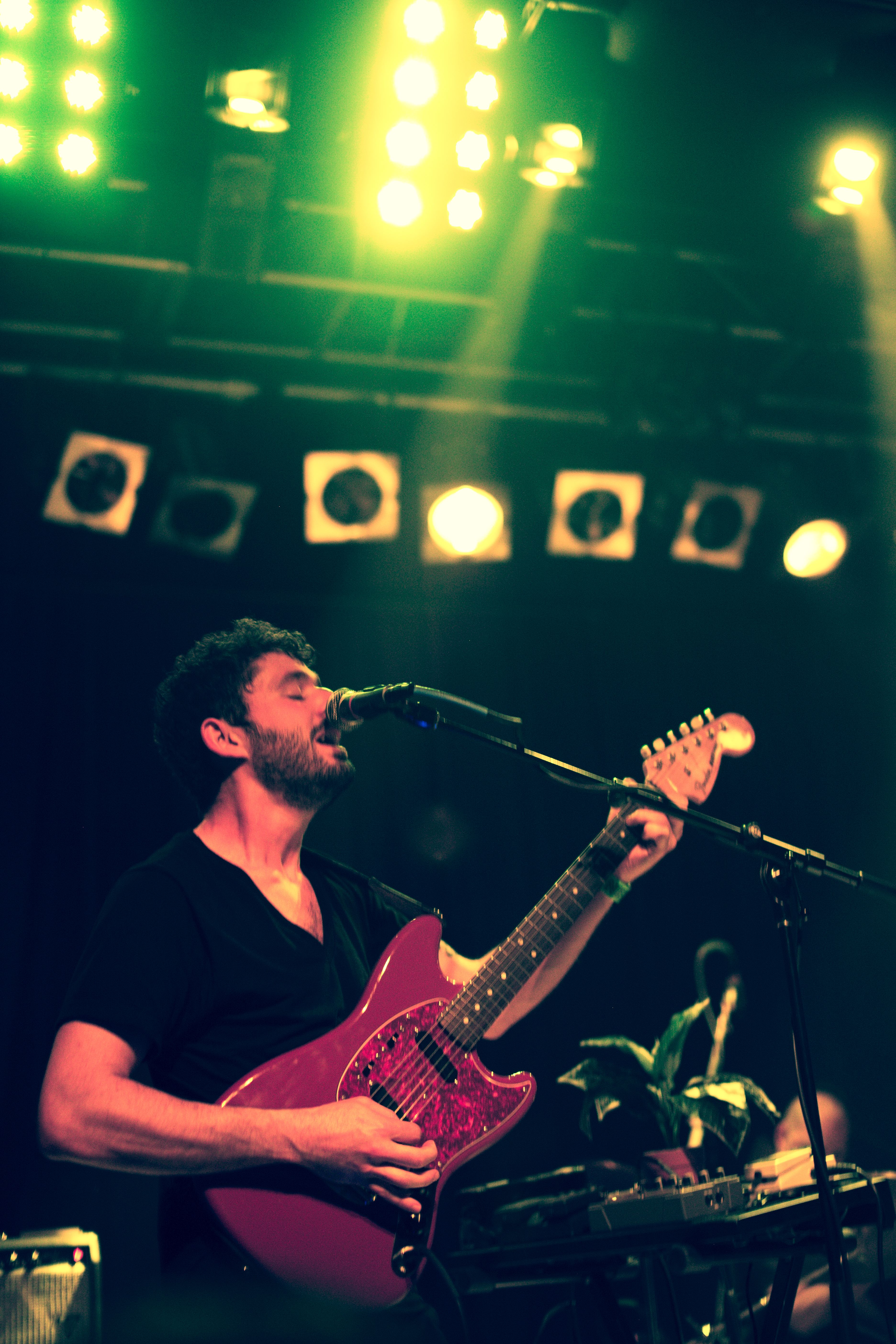
- The Antlers live at Neumos in Seattle in 2010
- Studio albums: 7
- EPs: 7
- Live albums: 2
- Compilation albums: 0
- Singles: 16
- Music videos: 9

Through their career, spanning 2005 to the present day, indie rock group The Antlers have released 7 full length studio albums, 2 live albums, and 7 EPs. The band started as a solo project by frontman Peter Silberman, with others joining for the recording of their 2009 album Hospice. As of December 2025, the band consists of Silberman and drummer Michael Lerner.

== Albums ==
=== Studio albums ===
Title	Album details	Peak chart positions						
Title	Album details	US	US Indie	AUS Hit.	BEL (FL)	BEL (WA)	UK	UK Indie
Uprooted	Released: October 10, 2006; Label: Self-released	—	—	—	—	—	—	—
In the Attic of the Universe	Released: November 6, 2007; Label: Fall	—	—	—	—	—	—	—
Hospice	Released: March 23, 2009; Label: Frenchkiss	— (Note: Hospice did not enter the US Billboard 200, but peaked at number 12 on the US Heatseekers Albums Chart.)	45	—	— (Note: Hospice did not enter the Flemish Ultratop 200 Albums chart, but peaked at number 45 on the Flemish Alternative Albums chart.)	—	—	—
Burst Apart	Released: May 10, 2011; Label: Frenchkiss	82	15	—	— (Note: Burst Apart did not enter the Flemish Ultratop 200 Albums chart, but peaked at number eight on the Flemish Heatseekers chart.)	—	167	—
Familiars	Released: June 17, 2014; Label: Anti-, Transgressive	73	12	12	19	105	94	12
Green to Gold	Released: March 26, 2021; Label: Anti-, Transgressive	— (Note: Green to Gold did not enter the US Billboard 200, but peaked at number 88 on the US Current Album Sales Chart.)	—	—	92	—	— (Note: Green to Gold did not enter the UK Albums chart, but peaked at number 20 on the UK Record Store chart.)	34
Blight	Released: October 10, 2025; Label: Transgressive	TBA						
"—" denotes album that did not chart or was not released

=== Live albums ===
- In London (2015)
- Hospice at Ten: Live in Chicago (2025)

== EPs ==
List of EPs, with selected chart positions
Title	Release	Peak chart positions			
Title	Release	US	US Indie	AUS Hit.	BEL (FL)
You Crawl to Our Sleep	2005	—	—	—	—
February Tape	2007	—	—	—	—
Cold War	2007	—	—	—	—
New York Hospitals	2008	—	—	—	—
(together)	November 22, 2011	—	—	—	—
Undersea	July 24, 2012	186	—	—	—
Losing Light	November 26, 2021	—	—	—	—
"—" denotes a recording that did not chart or was not released in that territory.

== Singles ==
List of singles, showing year released and album name
Title	Year	Album
"Bear"	2009	Hospice
"Two"	2009	Hospice
"Sylvia"	2009	Hospice
"I Don't Want Love"	2011	Burst Apart
"No Widows"	2011	Burst Apart
"French Exit"	2011	Burst Apart
"Drift Dive"	2012	Undersea
"Palace"	2014	Familiars
"Hotel"	2014	Familiars
"Wheels Roll Home"	2020	Green to Gold
"It Is What It Is"	2020	Green to Gold
"Solstice"	2021	Green to Gold
"Just One Sec"	2021	Green to Gold
"Ahimsa"	2022	Non-album single
"I Was Not There"	2023	Non-album single
"Rains"	2023	Non-album single
"Tide"	2023	Non-album single
"Need Nothing"	2023	Non-album single
"Carnage"	2025	Blight
"Something in the Air"	2025	Blight

== Music videos ==
Year	Video	Director
2009	"Two"	Ethan Segal, Albert Thrower
2010	"Bear"	Evan Dennis
2010	"Sylvia"	Trey Hock
2011	"Every Night My Teeth Are Falling Out"	Juliet Rios, Gabe Imlay
2012	"Drift Dive"	—
2014	"Palace"	Hana Tajima
2014	"Hotel"	Derrick Belcham
2021	Green to Gold	Derrick Belcham, Emily Terndrup
