= Green to Gold (album) =

2021 studio album by the Antlers

Studio album by the Antlers
- Released: March 26, 2021
- Studios: Harrington Road (New Paltz, New York); Lone Pine Road (Kingston, New York)
- Length: 47:04
- Labels: Anti-; Transgressive
- Producer: Peter Silberman

The Antlers chronology
Familiars (2014)	Green to Gold (2021)	Blight (2025)

Singles from Green to Gold
- 1. "Wheels Roll Home" Released: October 6, 2020; 2. "It Is What It Is" Released: November 10, 2020; 3. "Solstice" Released: January 13, 2021; 4. "Just One Sec" Released: February 17, 2021

Green to Gold is the sixth studio album by American indie rock group the Antlers. It was released on March 26, 2021, by Anti- in the U.S. and Transgressive Records in the U.K. and in Europe. It is the band's first album in seven years, and it marks the departure of multi-instrumentalist Darby Cicci. It also marks a significant departure from the darker and more intense qualities of the band's early work, trading their signature indie-electronic and ambient soundscapes for organic instrumentation and minimal arrangements that evoke a warm, pastoral atmosphere; the album incorporates field recordings of nature captured by frontman Peter Silberman. The lyrics also represent a shift in tone for Silberman, who opted for less ambiguous characters and more overt themes surrounding ageing and personal development. The album was preceded by the singles "Wheels Roll Home", "It Is What It Is", "Solstice", and "Just One Sec". It was accompanied by a feature-length film starring dancers Bobbi Jene Smith and Or Schraiber.

== Background and recording ==
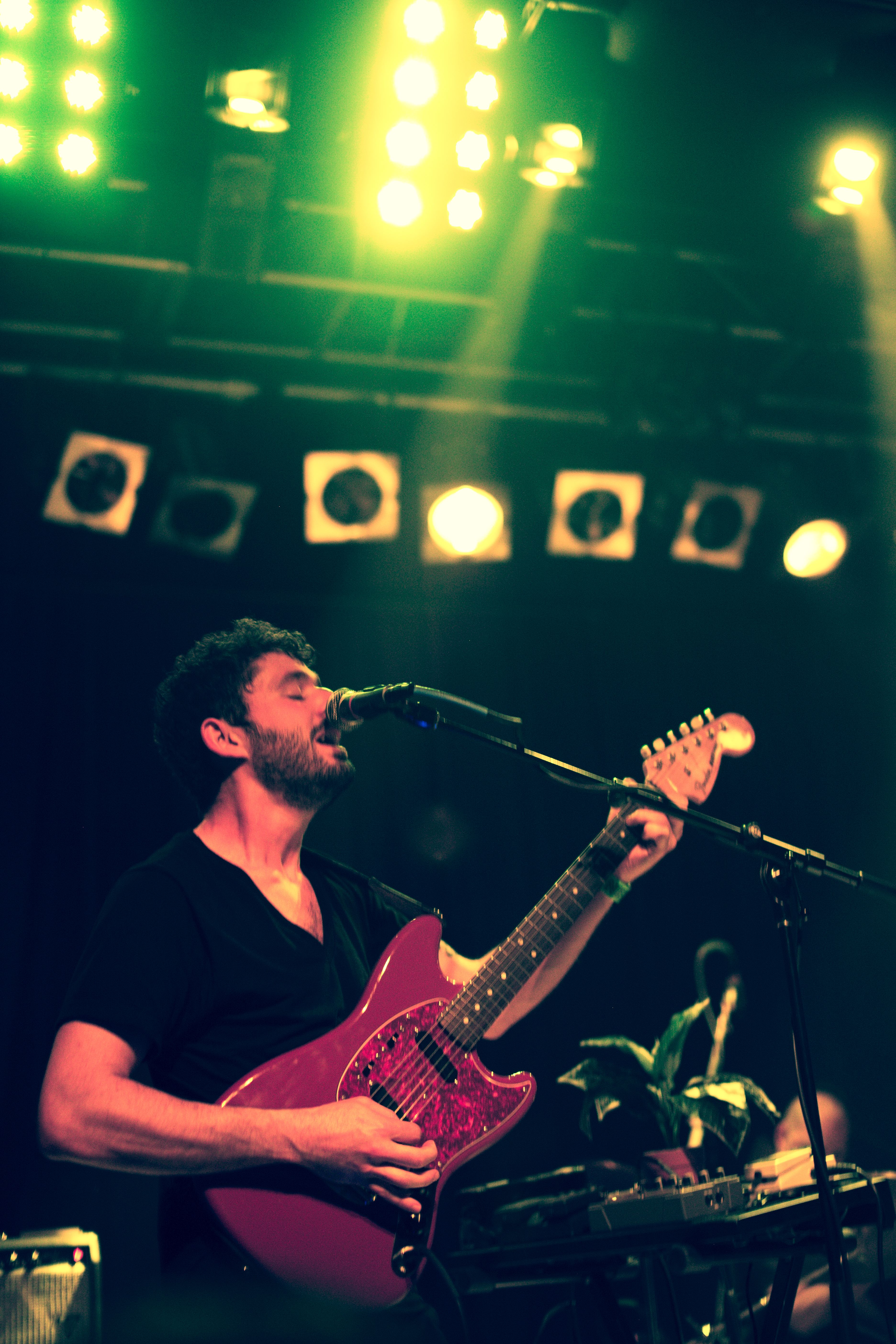
Peter Silberman

Green to Gold is the band's first album in seven years, succeeding their fifth studio album Familiars, which was released in June 2014. A few months before its release, lead singer Peter Silberman suffered a temporarily total hearing loss in his left ear. He experienced "tremendous" and "all-consuming" ear pain and extreme sound sensitivity, and was ultimately diagnosed with tinnitus, hyperacusis and cochlear hydrops (a rare form of Ménière's disease). Silberman was unsure he could continue singing, and contemplated quitting music altogether. He retreated from Brooklyn in 2015 to a cabin in upstate New York to record a solo album, entitled Impermanence, which was released in 2017. Silberman had quietly retired The Antlers, taking up gardening and meditation, and developing a meaningful relationship. Impermanence used silence as an instrument, employing a sparse and acoustic style of performing. The album was met with positive reviews from critics, but it received a mixed emotional response from fans of the band. After touring Impermanence, Silberman was diagnosed with vascular lesions on one of his vocal cords, and required surgery for their removal. He subsequently underwent vocal therapy to relearn how to sing and how to do diaphragmatic breathing. In 2021, Silberman said, "The fact that it recovered to the degree that it did is pretty rare, but I'm very grateful for it".

In 2017, the band denied rumors that they had broken up, writing, "While we don't have immediate plans to make new music, we'll surely be back when the time is right". In 2019, The Antlers reissued their third studio album, Hospice (2009). They embarked on a 10th anniversary tour, playing the album in its entirety. However, Silberman's health concerns led them to perform acoustic versions of the songs during intimate shows in smaller venues. The success of the tour was a creative impetus for the band. Silberman said the tour "rejuvenated [him], and cemented [his] decision to revive the project".

The songs on Green to Gold were written by Silberman and Michael Lerner between 2017 and 2020. The album was recorded primarily at Harrington Road in New Paltz, New York. Additional recording was done at Lone Pine Road in Kingston, New York. Field recordings of nature were recorded in New Paltz; Katonah, New York; Otis, Massachusetts; Rockport, Massachusetts and Luquillo, Puerto Rico. The album also marks the departure of multi-instrumentalist Darby Cicci.

== Music and lyrics ==
Sound of cicada
A chorus of cicadas appears in the background on opener "Strawflower" and Green to Gold's title track, contributing to the album's pastoral atmosphere.

The album's instrumentation has been described as "warm", "lustrous", "airy", and "pastoral". Moments of silence on the album are populated by nature field recordings primarily from Silberman's upstate New York home, including crickets, cicadas and wind. The album's title track documents the changing of the seasons. Chris White of musicOMH wrote, "For a band who made their name playing epically sad, often emotionally traumatic songs, Green to Gold sounds positively sunny and mellow in comparison. "Strawflower" and "Equinox", both instrumental tracks, serve as bookends "for the unfolding story told within them". The album has been characterized as "starkly minimal" due to its heavy reliance on organic acoustic instrumentation. This is in contrast with the band's previous albums, which employed ambient and electronic influences. The songs on Green to Gold feature "slow-building cascades of instrumentation" which develop "hypnotic" rhythms centered around guitars, piano, and Silberman's breathy and "eased" falsetto. There are occasional brass and strings arrangements, including bass clarinet on "Wheels Roll Home"; violin and viola on "Solstice"; cello on "Stubborn Man"; banjo on "Just One Sec" and "Volunteer"; slide guitar by Dave Harrington on "Just One Sec"; and baritone saxophone, flute, clarinet and French horn by Kelly Pratt on "It Is What It Is".

The songs on the album were written "almost entirely in the morning hours," with Silberman seeking to make "Sunday morning music". Silberman has said Green to Gold stands alone in the band's discography in being devoid of the "unsettling quality" which characterized their previous albums. Fred Thomas of AllMusic agreed: "There are hints of sunny melancholy here and there on Green to Gold, but the mood is never dire or eerie". Guia Cortassa of The Quietus wrote, "The constant sense of apnoea and claustrophobia saturating all his previous work is gone, leaving space for a rediscovered breathing".

The album's themes center around ageing and the "unstoppable force of change" as they relate to the limitations of the human experience in the natural world. The album celebrates the process of "going home, overcoming stubbornness, transitioning from one season to the next, leaving behind the old as a natural way of shedding the past". Silberman opted for a more direct approach on Green to Gold; the album documents two years in his life, taking inspiration from conversations with his friends and partner. Silberman said, "I think the shift in tone is the result of getting older. It doesn't make sense for me to try to tap into the same energy that I did ten or fifteen years ago, because I continue to grow as a person, as I'm sure our audience does too. Green to Gold is about this idea of gradual change. People changing over time, struggling to accept change in those they love, and struggling to change themselves. And yet despite all our difficulty with this, nature somehow makes it look easy".

== Release and promotion ==
The album's first single, "Wheels Roll Home", was released on October 6, 2020, and was the band's first new music in six years. A second single, "It Is What It Is", was released on November 10, 2020. The band officially announced Green to Gold on January 13, 2021, simultaneously releasing the single "Solstice". The album's fourth and final single, "Just One Sec", was released on February 17, 2021. On March 24, 2021, the band premiered its accompanying "feature-length dance film" directed by Derrick Belcham and Emily Terndrup. It stars dancers Bobbi Jene Smith and Or Schraiber and was shot in a farmhouse in New York's Catskill Mountains. The film's narrative presents "multiple, non-linear time slices of their life together over its rich and dynamic course". The album's singles were previously accompanied with visuals from the film. Green to Gold was released on March 26, 2021, by ANTI- in the U.S. and Transgressive Records in the U.K./Europe.

=== Tour ===
On November 16, 2021, the band announced a Spring 2022 tour in support of the album, originally set to begin in March 2022 in Europe and extending to June 2022 in North America. The announcement coincided with the release of the Losing Light EP. In February 2022, the band announced the cancellation of all UK and Europe shows. The North American tour extended from May into June 2022. Only one show–a concert at the Crescent Ballroom in Phoenix scheduled for May 17–was cancelled as a result of Silberman losing his voice.

List of concerts, showing date, city, and venue
Date	City	Venue
May 2, 2022	Hamden, Connecticut	Space Ballroom
May 4, 2022	New York City	Music Hall of Williamsburg
May 6, 2022	Philadelphia	First Unitarian Church
May 7, 2022	Washington, D.C.	Miracle Theatre
May 8, 2022	Carrboro, North Carolina	Cat's Cradle
May 9, 2022	Asheville, North Carolina	The Grey Eagle
May 10, 2022	Atlanta	Terminal West
May 12, 2022	Austin, Texas	Antone's
May 13, 2022	Dallas	Texas Theatre
May 14, 2022	Oklahoma City	Beer City Music Hall
May 18, 2022	Solana Beach, California	Belly Up Tavern
May 20, 2022	Los Angeles	Pico Union Project
May 21, 2022	San Francisco	Bimbo's 365 Club
May 23, 2022	Portland, Oregon	Aladdin Theater
May 24, 2022	Seattle	Neumos
May 26, 2022	Salt Lake City	Urban Lounge
May 27, 2022	Denver	Bluebird Theater
May 28, 2022	Omaha, Nebraska	The Waiting Room Lounge
May 29, 2022	Minneapolis	Fine Line Music Cafe
May 31, 2022	Chicago	Thalia Hall
June 2, 2022	Detroit	El Club
June 3, 2022	Toronto	The Great Hall
June 4, 2022	Montreal	Le Studio TD
June 5, 2022	Cambridge, Massachusetts	The Sinclair

== Critical reception ==
Professional ratings
Aggregate scores
Source	Rating
AnyDecentMusic?	7.7/10
Metacritic	80/100
Review scores
Source	Rating
AllMusic	3.5/5 stars
DIY	4.5/5 stars
Exclaim!	9/10
The Line of Best Fit	7/10
Mojo	4/5 stars
musicOMH	4/5 stars
Pitchfork	7.4/10
Record Collector	4/5 stars
Slant Magazine	3.5/5 stars
Uncut	8/10

Green to Gold was met with favorable reviews from music critics. At Metacritic, which assigns a normalized rating out of 100 to reviews from professional publications, the album received an average score of 80, based on 12 reviews. Aggregator AnyDecentMusic? gave it 7.7 out of 10, based on their assessment of the critical consensus.

Fred Thomas of AllMusic wrote, "Green to Gold reshapes the Antlers' once somber and brooding chamber pop into something bright and smiling. The songs strip away the sharpness and volatility the band reveled in on earlier albums to reveal a pleasant glow that was all too often hidden in the shadows". Joe Goggins of DIY gave the album a 4.5 out of 5 star rating, calling it "the opening of a new chapter, rather than the closing of the last one". Goggins praised Silberman's "newly-tranquil voice" for perfectly complementing with "the most reflective lyrical material of his career". Dylan Barnabe of Exclaim! gave the album a 9 out of 10 rating, calling it a "master class in quiet contemplation and coming-of-age for the modern millennial". John Aizlewood, in his review for Mojo, wrote, "There's real beauty here and Silberman marries eventual accessibility with gentle boundary-pushing to create his own, thoughtful world". Johnny Sharp of Uncut gave the album an 8 out of 10 rating, praising the accessibility of Silberman's vocal melodies. Guia Cortassa of The Quietus called the album a "textural mass [...] of perfectly woven sounds and voice".

Katherine Rodgers of The Line of Best Fit praised the horns arrangements on "It Is What It Is" and the piano on "Porchlight", but lamented the lack of "angst" in Silberman's lyrics which characterized previous Antlers releases. Chris White of musicOMH felt the album lacked "any truly standout songs" like Hospice's "Epilogue" or Burst Apart's "Putting the Dog to Sleep", but concluded "it's still a sumptuously crafted, warmly atmospheric and often beautiful work from The Antlers, proving that Silberman remains one of America's most gifted, emotionally intelligent songwriters". Jordan Walsh of Slant Magazine gave the album a 3.5 out of 5 star rating, criticizing the "lack of intensity" for allowing the songs to "sink into the background a little too easily". Walsh continued, "Sonically, they all have the same placid air about them, with few distinctive peaks or valleys. But [...] this approach allows the Antlers to color in a moment without demanding too much attention [...] It's clear that the Antlers are still capable of conjuring beauty".

=== Year-end lists ===
Green to Gold on year-end lists
Publication	List	Rank	Ref.
Magnet	Top 25 Albums of 2021	7	
musicOMH	Top 50 Albums of 2021	26	
NBHAP	50 Best Albums of 2021	12	

== Track listing ==
All tracks are written by Peter Silberman and Michael Lerner.

Green to Gold track listing
No.	Title	Length
1.	"Strawflower"	3:55
2.	"Wheels Roll Home"	4:24
3.	"Solstice"	3:55
4.	"Stubborn Man"	5:50
5.	"Just One Sec"	4:49
6.	"It Is What It Is"	3:57
7.	"Volunteer"	5:54
8.	"Green to Gold"	7:16
9.	"Porchlight"	4:11
10.	"Equinox"	2:53
Total length:		47:04

== Personnel ==
Credits adapted from the album's liner notes.

The Antlers

- Peter Silberman – vocals, guitar, bass, pedal steel, piano, organ, production, engineering
- Michael Lerner – drums, percussion

Additional personnel

- Jon Natchez – bass clarinet (track 2)
- Will Harvey – violin (track 3), viola (track 3)
- Brent Arnold – cello (track 4)
- David Moore – banjo (tracks 5, 7)
- Dave Harrington – slide guitar (track 5)
- Kelly Pratt – baritone saxophone (track 6), flute (track 6), clarinet (track 6), French horn (track 6)
- Tim Mislock – guitar (track 8)
- Nicholas Principe – mixing
- Gus Elg – mastering
- Zan Goodman – art direction, design
- Landon Speers – cover, additional photography
- Shervin Lainez – band photography

== Charts ==
Chart performance for Green to Gold
Chart (2021)	Peak position
Belgian Albums (Ultratop Flanders)	92

== Losing Light ==
Losing Light

EP by the Antlers
- Released: November 16, 2021
- Studios: Harrington Road (New Paltz, New York); Lone Pine Road (Kingston, New York); Mountain Acres (High Falls, New York)
- Length: 15:31
- Labels: Anti-; Transgressive
- Producer: Peter Silberman

On November 16, 2021, the band released an EP titled Losing Light, which features reimagined versions of four songs from Green to Gold. The EP is an exploration into what the songs on Green to Gold would theoretically sound like if they were recreated 50 years in the future and by using only memory. The reimagined versions on Losing Light also take into consideration the potential technological advancements of the future as well as the effects of analog and digital degradation. Silberman and Lerner constructed the EP using elements from the earliest versions and demos of the songs, as well as fragments from the album versions, and newly created recordings. The elements were then processed "in ways that would repeatedly age them backwards and forwards, as if being blasted into the past, then flung into the future". The EP was recorded at Harrington Road in New Paltz, with additional recording at Lone Pine Road in Kingston, New York and Mountain Acres in High Falls, New York. The release of Losing Light coincided with the announcement of the Spring 2022 tour.

=== Track listing ===
All tracks are written by Peter Silberman and Michael Lerner.

Losing Light track listing
No.	Title	Original track	Length
1.	"Losing Light"	"Solstice"	2:24
2.	"Volunteered"	"Volunteer"	6:02
3.	"G2G"	"Green to Gold"	4:13
4.	"Twas"	"It Is What It Is"	2:52
Total length:			15:31

=== Personnel ===
Credits adapted from Bandcamp.

- Peter Silberman – vocals, guitar, bass, piano, organ, synthesizers, production, engineering
- Michael Lerner – drums, electronic percussion
- Nicholas Principe – mixing
- Gus Elg – mastering
- Ryan Hover – album cover painting
- Landon Speers – original cover photography
