= Uprooted =

Uprooted may refer to:

== Books ==
- Uprooted (novel), a 2015 fantasy novel written by Naomi Novik
- The Uprooted, a 1952 book about European migrations into the United States by Oscar Handlin

== Music ==
- Uprooted (Absent Element album), 2005
- Uprooted (The Antlers album), 2006
- Uprooted (The Rankin Family album), 1998

== Television ==
- "Uprooted" (Star Wars: Young Jedi Adventures), an episode of Star Wars: Young Jedi Adventures
