= L.A. Dance Project =

Contemporary Ballet dance company based in Los Angeles

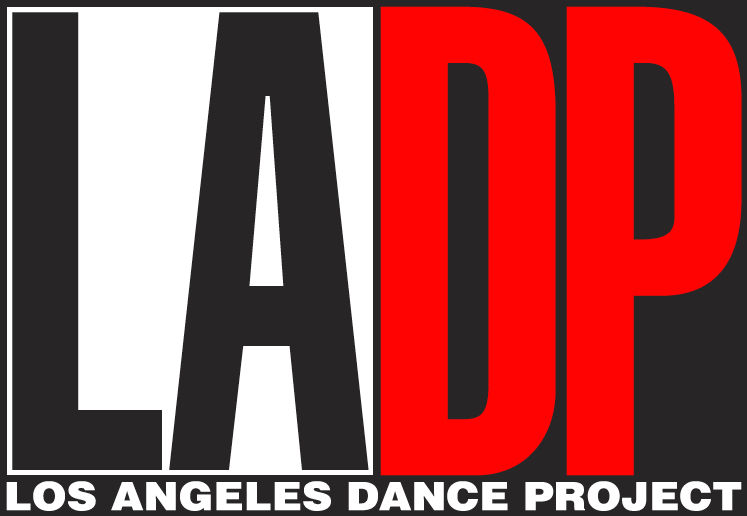

General information
- Name: L.A. Dance Project
- Year founded: 2011; 15 years ago
- Founders: Benjamin Millepied; Nico Muhly; Nicholas Britell; Matthieu Humery; Charles Fabius
- Principal venue: 2245 East Washington Boulevard Los Angeles
- Website: www.ladanceproject.org

Artistic staff
- Artistic director: Benjamin Millepied
- Ballet master: Sebastien Marcovici, Associate Artistic Director)

L.A. Dance Project (LADP) is a contemporary ballet company based in Los Angeles. It was founded in 2011 by choreographer and dancer Benjamin Millepied. It is currently made up of 7 dancers, and led by Millepied.

== History ==
Launched in 2011 as an art collective with a commission from the Glorya Kaufman Presents Dance at the Los Angeles Music Center., L.A. Dance Project was founded by Millepied, Nico Muhly, Nicholas Britell, art advisor Matthieu Humery and producer Charles Fabius. L.A. Dance Project premiered at Walt Disney Concert Hall on September 22, 2012. The program featured Quintett by William Forsythe, Winterbranch by Merce Cunningham, and Moving Parts by Millepied, in a collaboration with composer Nico Muhly and visual artist Christopher Wool.

Shortly after founding the company, Millepied was appointed the Director of the Paris Opera Ballet, and for two years, he ran both companies concurrently. Millepied returned to Los Angeles, and full-time to L.A. Dance Project in 2016.

== International acclaim ==
The company has toured all over the world, performing in venues and festivals including the Edinburgh International Festival, Brooklyn Academy of Music, Théâtre du Châtelet, Sadlers Wells, and Esplanade – Theatres on the Bay.

== Collaboration with Van Cleef & Arpels ==
Since its founding in 1896, luxury jewellery brand Van Cleef & Arpels has drawn inspiration from dance, with the first ballerina clips appearing from the Maison in the 1940s. The collaboration between L.A. Dance Project and Van Cleef & Arpels began in 2012, when Nicolas Bos, CEO of VCA, met Millepied, and the jeweller commissioned a project, the Gems trilogy. Gems, comprising Reflections (2012), Hearts and Arrows (2014) and On The Other Side (2016), marked the continuation of the collaborative relationship between Van Cleef & Arpels and choreographers, which began with George Balanchine's 1967 opus Jewels, originally suggested by Claude Arpels.

The relationship between L.A. Dance Project and Van Cleef & Arpels has continued far beyond the initial collaboration on Gems, with the Maison partnering on the creation of multiple works for the company. Most recently, to mark the premiere Millepied's Romeo and Juliet Suite, the Maison unveiled a new collection, retelling the story through jewellery pieces.

In 2021, Van Cleef & Arpels furthered their commitment to supporting the creation and performance of dance, with the Dance Reflections initiative, which, in addition to supporting L.A. Dance Project, now supports choreographers and companies around the world.

== Performance space ==
In 2017, L.A. Dance Project opened their first designated rehearsal and performance space in Los Angeles at 2245 East Washington Boulevard. The space was designed by Iannuzzi Studio and received a 2023 AIA Michigan Honor Award in the Interior Awards category. In addition to daily rehearsal, the company presents regular performances in the space, often using it to premiere new works

In addition to company repertory performances, L.A. Dance Project frequently partners with other dance companies and organisations to present their work in the performance space.

The company now offers artist residencies through the LAUNCH:LA initiative. The residency awards free use of the performance space to emerging choreographers and dance makers, also awarding them production creation and artist stipends.

== Repertory ==
Year	Repertory	Choreographer	Premiered	Notes
2019	5 Live Calibrations	Madeline Hollander	Theatre des Champs-Elysees, Paris	Music by Celia Hollander. Later performed at the Louvre Abu Dhabi
2019	Adagio in B Minor	Janie Taylor	L.A. Dance Project Performance Space	Taylor's Choreography debut
2012	Attitude du Cage	Nathan Makolandra and Julia Eichten	Smithsonian Museum, Washington D.C.	Performed as part of John Cage Centennial
2018	Chapter Song	Kyle Abraham	Moody Performance Hall, Dallas	
2006	Closer	Benjamin Millepied	Joyce Theater, New York City	Created by Millepied prior to creation of L.A. Dance Project
2015	Harbor Me	Sidi Larbi Cherkaoui	Théâtre du Châtelet, Paris	
2014	Hearts and Arrows	Benjamin Millepied	Olympia Theatre, Miami	
2014	Helix	Justin Peck	Walt Disney Concert Hall, Los Angeles	
2016	Homecoming	Benjamin Millepied	The Theatre, Ace Hotel Los Angeles	Music performed live by Rufus Wainwright
2018	Homeward	Benjamin Millepied	Hauser & Wirth, Los Angeles	Music by Bryce Dessner
2019	I fall, I flow, I melt	Benjamin Millepied	L.A. Dance Project Performance Space	Costumes by Alessandro Sartori
2014	II Acts for the Blind	Roy Assaf	Opéra de Saint-Étienne in collaboration with Biennale de la danse de Lyon	
2017	In Silence We Speak	Benjamin Millepied	Joyce Theater, New York City	Music by David Lang
2019	Kinaesonata	Bella Lewitzky	Theatre des Champs-Elysees, Paris	Revival of work from 1970. New scenic design by Charles Gaines
2019	Kora	Charm La'Donna	L.A. Dance Project Performance Space	Scenic design by Njideka Akunyili Crosby
2016	Martha Graham Duets	Martha Graham	Joyce Theater, New York City	Excerpted from Canticle for Innocent Comedians and Diversion of Angels
2016	MinEvent	Merce Cunningham	Hammer Museum, Los Angeles	Arranged and Staged by Silas Riener
2013	Morgan's Last Chug	Emanuel Gat	Maison de la danse, Lyon	
2012	Moving Parts	Benjamin Millepied	Walt Disney Concert Hall, Los Angeles	Music by Nico Muhly, Visual Installation by Christopher Wool
2013	Murder Ballades	Justin Peck	Maison de la danse, Lyon	Visual Installation by Sterling Ruby
2021	Night Bloom	Janie Taylor	L.A. Dance Project, 2245 East Washington Blvd	Premiered in outdoor performance space, during COVID-19 pandemic
2016	On The Other Side	Benjamin Millepied	Sadlers Wells, London	Art by Mark Bradford
2017	Orpheus Highway	Benjamin Millepied	Joyce Theater, New York City	Set to Triple Quartet by Steve Reich
2014	Peripheral Stream	Hiroaki Umeda	Théâtre du Châtelet, Paris	
2012	Quintett	William Forsythe	Walt Disney Concert Hall, Los Angeles	Revival of work from 1993
2013	Reflections	Benjamin Millepied	Théâtre du Châtelet, Paris	Visual Installation and Costume Design by Barbara Kruger
2022	Romeo and Juliet Suite	Benjamin Millepied	La Seine Musicale, Paris	Adaptation of Romeo and Juliet by Sergei Prokofiev. Originally performed in a shortened version with the Los Angeles Philharmonic Orchestra under the direction of Gustavo Dudamel
2022	Be Here Now	Benjamin Millepied	Théâtre du Châtelet, Paris	Visual and Video Installation by Barbara Kruger, Music by Andy Akiho and Caroline Shaw
2019	Rising Water	Gianna Reisen	L.A. Dance Project Performance Space	
2018	Run From Me	Shannon Gillen	Musco Center for the Arts, Chapman University	
2009	Sarabande	Benjamin Millepied	Maison de la danse, Lyon	Originally choreographed for Millepied's pick-up troupe Danses Concertantes
2022	Quartet for Five	Bobbi Jene Smith and Or Schraiber	Théâtre du Châtelet, Paris	
2022	Elastic Ballet	Madeline Hollander	Théâtre du Châtelet, Paris	
2022	Everyone Keeps Me	Pam Tanowitz	Théâtre du Châtelet, Paris	Originally created for the Royal Ballet, London
2017	Second Quartet	Noé Soulier	La Cours des Forges, Parc des Ateliers, Arles	Created during LUMA Foundation residency
2020	Solo at Dusk	Bobbi Jene Smith and Or Schraiber	L.A. Dance Project Performance Space	Premiered in outdoor performance space, during COVID-19 pandemic
2019	Split Step	Emily Mast and Zack Winokur in collaboration with dancers of L.A. Dance Project	L.A. Dance Project Performance Space	
2020	The Betweens	Jermaine Spivey and Spenser Theberge in collaboration with dancers of L.A. Dance Project	L.A. Dance Project Performance Space	Premiered in outdoor performance space, during COVID-19 pandemic
2019	(untitled) (2018/19)	Tino Sehgal	Theatre des Champs-Elysees, Paris	Later performed at the Louvre Abu Dhabi
2012	Winterbranch	Merce Cunningham	Walt Disney Concert Hall, Los Angeles	Revival of 1963 work. Visual and Costume Design by Robert Rauschenberg
2017	Yag	Ohad Naharin	Joyce Theater, New York City	Revival of 1993 work
2023	Unstill Life	Benjamin Millepied	Nuits de Fourvière, Lyon	Performed and conceived by Millepied and Alexandre Tharaud
2023	The Missing Mountain	Bobbi Jene Smith and Or Schraiber	L.A. Dance Project Performance Space	
2023	Lineage	Jamar Roberts	L.A. Dance Project Performance Space	
2022	Festival in Motion	Benjamin Millepied, Madeline Hollander, Janie Taylor, Saburo Teshigawara, Bobbi Jene Smith, Salia Sanou, Jill Johnson, Dimitri Chamblas, Mythili Prakash, Bouchra Ouizguen, MAZELFRETEN, Rauf Yasit and Brigel Gjoka	Various, Doha, Qatar	L.A. Dance Project took a key role, performing multiple new works in the first Festival in Motion, which took place in Qatar as a part of the cultural programming accompanying the 2022 Fifa World Cup. The Festival was curated by Benjamin Millepied and Nico Muhly, presented by Qatar Museums, and commissioned by Sheikha Al-Mayassa bint Hamad bin Khalifa Al Thani.
2024	Me.You.We.They	Benjamin Millepied	Philharmonie de Paris	Music by Nico Muhly
2024	Triade	Benjamin Millepied	Philharmonie de Paris	Music by Nico Muhly
2024	Sleepwalker's Encyclopaedia	Janie Taylor	L.A. Dance Project Performance Space	Set Design by Benjamin Styer
2025	Polovtsian Dances	Jobel Medina	Philharmonie de Paris	Music by Alexander Borodin
2025	The Rite of Spring	Idio Chichava (performed with dancers from the Mozambican company Converge+)	Philharmonie de Paris	Music by Igor Stravinsky
2025	Rituel	Benjamin Millepied	Philharmonie de Paris	Music by Pierre Boulez
