= Urs Fischer =

Urs Fischer may refer to:

- Urs Fischer (artist) (born 1973), Swiss-born contemporary visual artist
- Urs Fischer (footballer) (born 1966), Swiss football manager and former player
