= Impermanence (Peter Silberman album) =

Studio album by Peter Silberman
- Released: February 24, 2017
- Studio: People Teeth (Saugerties, New York)
- Genres: Slowcore, ambient, indie rock
- Length: 36:02
- Labels: Anti-, Transgressive
- Producers: Peter Silberman; Nicholas Principe

Peter Silberman chronology
Transcendless Summer (2016)	Impermanence (2017)

Singles from Impermanence
- 1. "Karuna" Released: December 1, 2016; 2. "New York" Released: January 11, 2017; 3. "Ahimsa" Released: February 17, 2017

Impermanence is the debut studio album by Peter Silberman, the frontman of the Brooklyn-based indie rock band the Antlers. The album was released on February 24, 2017, through Anti- and Transgressive Records, following the release of Silberman's 2016 extended play Transcendless Summer.

== Background and recording ==
Work on the album started after Silberman began suffering from tinnitus, hyperacusis, and cochlear hydrops. These hearing impairments began prior to the release of The Antlers' 2014 album Familiars. As the album was written while Silberman regained his hearing, the instrumentation is quiet and muffled akin to the style of ambient music. The album was written by Silberman between 2013–2016 in Brooklyn, New York; Block Island, Rhode Island; Somers, New York; Woodside, California; Big Sur, California; Portland, Oregon; and Saugerties, New York. It was produced by Silberman and Nicholas Principe, and engineered by Principe at People Teeth in Saugerties. The album also incorporates field recordings of nature from Woodside; Big Sur; and Block Island.

== Critical reception ==
Professional ratings
Aggregate scores
Source	Rating
Metacritic	78/100
Review scores
Source	Rating
AllMusic	3.5/5 stars
Clash	7/10
Exclaim!	8/10
The Guardian	4/5 stars
Mojo	4/5 stars
Pitchfork	6.9/10
PopMatters	7/10
Record Collector	3/5 stars
Sputnikmusic	3.2/5
Uncut	8/10

Impermanence was met with a positive critical reception. At Metacritic, which assigns a normalized rating out of 100 to reviews from professional publications, the album received an average score of 78, based on 17 reviews. Daniel Sylvester of Exclaim! gave the album an 8 out of 10 rating, writing, "The results show the oft-dramatic vocalist crafting some of his most meditative and emotional songs to date, as the high drama is cleverly delivered through pained phrasings and gently cinematic instrumentation." In a 4 out of 5 star review, Jon Dennis of The Guardian wrote, "His multi-octave voice is as intense as Jeff Buckley's or Anohni's, but it's vulnerable without being precious or cloying." AllMusic gave the album 3½ out of 4 stars, with reviewer Timothy Monger writing, "From the serene liquidity of "Karuna" to the spatial experimentations of the instrumental title track, Silberman's personal transformations are revealed on this thoughtful and understated debut."

== Track listing ==
All tracks are written by Peter Silberman.

No.	Title	Length
1.	"Karuna"	8:48
2.	"New York"	3:28
3.	"Gone Beyond"	8:18
4.	"Maya"	5:12
5.	"Ahimsa"	6:57
6.	"Impermanence"	3:19
Total length:		36:02

== Personnel ==
Credits adapted from Bandcamp.

- Peter Silberman – vocals, guitars, Rhodes, pedal steel, accordion, Tibetan bowl, production
- Nicholas Principe – percussion (on "Karuna", "Gone Beyond", and "Ahimsa"), doo-wop vocals (on "Gone Beyond"), production, engineering
- Hana Tajima – doo-wop vocals (on "Gone Beyond")
- Kelly Pratt – flutes (on "New York"), brass (on "New York")
- Michael Lerner – percussion (on "Gone Beyond")
- Tim Mislock – guitar (on "Gone Beyond")
- David Moore – piano (on "Impermanence"), pump organ (on "Impermanence"), farfisa (on "Impermanence")
- Peter Tullio – Ujjayi breath (on "Karuna" and "Impermenance"), finger snapping (on "Gone Beyond")
- Andrew Dunn – mixing
- Joe Lambert – mastering
- Justin Hollar – photography
- Zan Goodman – jacket design, art direction
