= Bobbi Jene Smith =

American dancer and actress (born 1983)

- Born: November 7, 1983 (age 42); Ames, Iowa, United States
- Education: Juilliard School (didn't graduate)
- Occupations: Dancer; teacher; choreographer
- Known for: Subject of 2017 documentary Bobbi Jene
- Partner: Or Schraiber

Bobbi Jene Smith (born November 7, 1983) is an American dancer, teacher and choreographer, known for being the subject of Elvira Lind's 2017 documentary Bobbi Jene.

== Early life and education ==
Bobbi Jene Smith was born in 1983 in Ames, Iowa. Smith was educated at the North Carolina School of the Arts and the Royal Winnipeg Ballet. She attended the dance division at Juilliard School but didn't graduate.

== Career ==
From 2005–2014, Smith was a member of the Batsheva Dance Company, where she was mentored by Ohad Naharin.

In 2012 Smith choreographed the dance piece Arrowed which she performed with actor Oscar Isaac. Isaac's girlfriend Elvira Lind was in the audience, and she began a correspondence with Smith, eventually persuading Smith to let Lind film her for a documentary. The resulting film, Bobbi Jene, premiered at the 2017 Tribeca Film Festival and depicts Smith's decision to leave the Batsheva Dance Company to try to choreograph her own pieces in America.

Subsequently, Smith choreographed the eerie "dance" scene at the climax of Alex Garland's 2018 science fiction film, Annihilation, which also stars Isaac (although he is not involved in the choreographed scene, which features Natalie Portman and Sonoya Mizuno).

Smith made her feature film debut in the 2012 Israeli film Yossi in a small supporting role. She also appeared in Georgia Parris's 2018 dance-drama Mari, where she played the lead role of a woman mourning the loss of her mother.

In 2021, Smith co-starred with Or Schraiber in the accompanying film for the album Green to Gold by American indie rock band the Antlers, which involves the highs and lows of a relationship being portrayed entirely through interpretive dance.

Alongside her partner, the dancer Or Schraiber, Smith founded the American Modern Opera Company. Both Smith and Schraiber are artists-in-residence at the L.A. Dance Project.

== Filmography ==
Year	Title	Role	Notes	Ref(s)
2015	Mr. Gaga	Self		
2017	Bobbi Jene	Self		
2018	Mari	Charlotte		
2018	Annihilation		Choreographer	
2020	Aviva	Eden	Also producer	
2020	Asaf Avidan: Anagnorisis [MV]	Dancer		
2021	Green to Gold	Self	Also choreographer	
2024	Life Hacks for Lovers	Roberta		
