= Dimitri Chamblas =

French dancer and choreographer

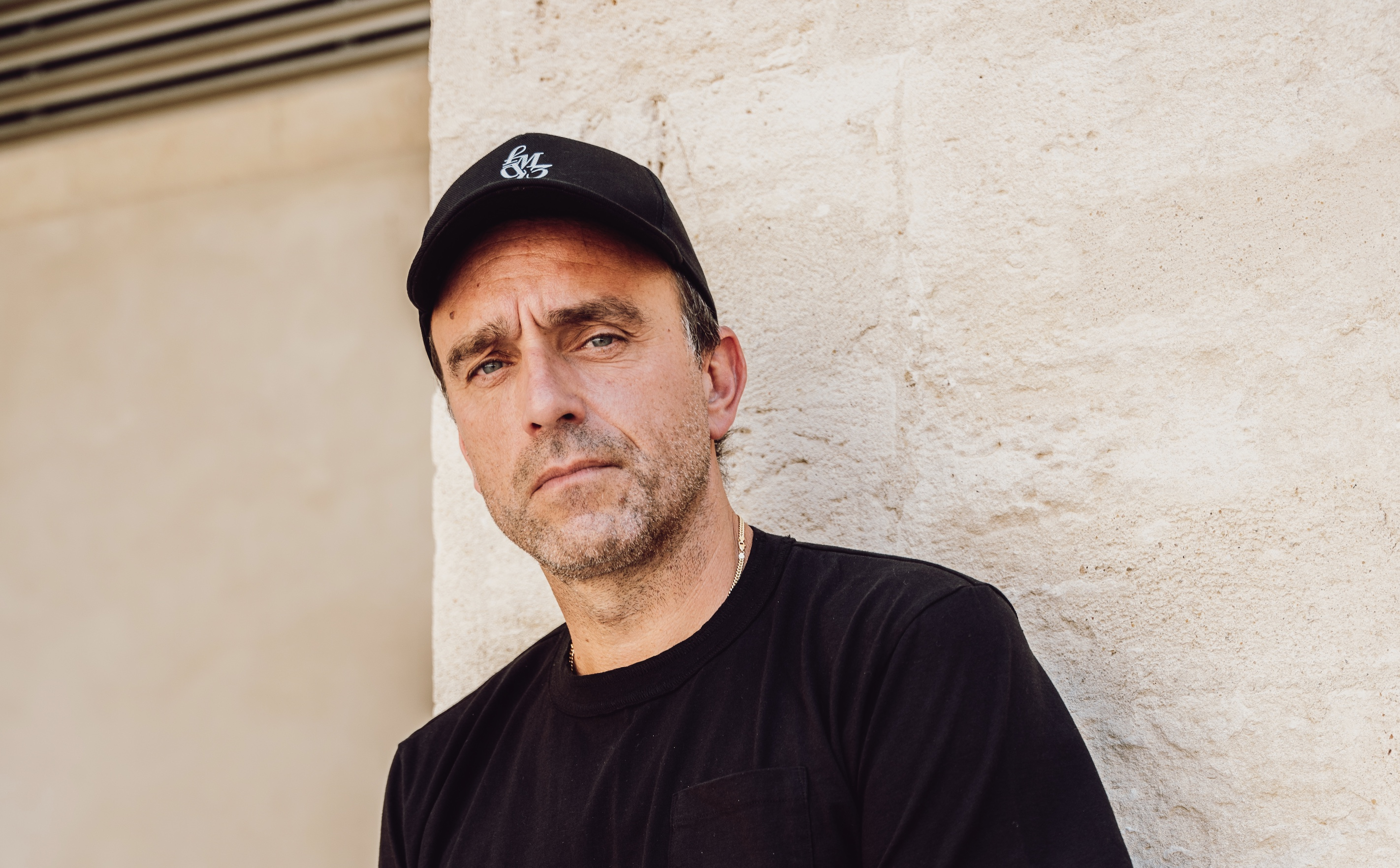
- Born: 1974 (age 51–52); France
- Education: Paris Opera School; Conservatoire National Supérieur de Musique de Lyon
- Occupations: Dancer, choreographer
- Known for: Studio Dimitri Chamblas
- Style: Contemporary dance
- Awards: Order of Arts and Letters (2019)
- Website: www.dimitrichamblas.com

Dimitri Chamblas (born 1974) is a French dancer and contemporary dance choreographer, as well as artistic director and film producer.

His work has been exhibited at Tate Modern, the Centre Pompidou in Paris, the Geffen Contemporary (MOCA), the Opéra National de Paris, and Skirball Center for the Performing Arts.

Over the course of his career he has collaborated with choreographers Lil Buck, Boris Charmatz, William Forsythe, Benjamin Millepied, and Mathilde Monnier; artists Christian Boltanski, Dan Colen, Andy Goldsworthy, Kim Gordon, Alex Prager, and Xavier Veilhan; director Rebecca Zlotowski; creative directors Virginie Viard, Jean Paul Gautier, and Karl Lagerfeld; composer Heiner Goebbels; and conductor Barbara Hannigan.

== Biography ==
Dimitri Chamblas was trained from the age of 10 at the Paris Opera School and then at the Conservatoire National Supérieur de Musique de Lyon. He interpreted roles for choreographers such as Dominique Bagouet, Régine Chopinot, Emmanuelle Huynh, and Mathilde Monnier (notably in Arrêtez, arrêtons, arrête in 1997). However, it is mainly with Boris Charmatz that he became internationally known through their artistic collaboration. They have been partners since 1990, notably with the success of Les Disparates (1994) and especially the widely performed duet À bras-le-corps (1993). This piece has been part of the Paris Opera ballet repertoire since 2017. It was performed in the middle of a rectangle made up of a simple row of spectators, with whom they interacted from time to time.

In 1992, Charmatz and Chamblas created the association Edna. Together, they developed open projects, mainly oriented towards performances in connection with various media, including video, visual arts, and literature.

In 1996, he created with Mathilde Monnier (then director of the Centre chorégraphique national de Montpellier, France) the Research and choreographic writing residencies, an opportunity for artists to create personal creative spaces outside the traditional production process.

Dimitri Chamblas also creates audiovisual objects and signs projects mixing dance and video, such as Horace-Bénédict. In 1999, Chamblas founded Same Productions, which designs and produces art films, music videos and advertising campaigns.

In 2011, with Benjamin Millepied, he participates in the foundation of the LA Dance Project by integrating the leadership college of this structure.

In March 2014, Dimitri Chamblas founded and took over the artistic direction of the 3rd Scène of the Opéra national de Paris. As its director, he invited international artists to create original works (films, photos, drawings, etc.) for the Opéra national de Paris.

In 2017, he was appointed Dean of the Sharon Disney Lund School of Dance at the California Institute of the Arts (CalArts) and created various projects such as HHUMANN, a work of 75 dancers presented on the streets of Downtown Los Angeles and at the Hauser&Wirth Gallery; The Floor, a mobile scenographic device; as well as publications such as Imagine a Dance Training.

That same year, he launched Studio Dimitri Chamblas in Paris and Los Angeles, an entity that hosts all of his projects and collaborations, including a duet with prima ballerina Marie-Agnès Gillot, his participation in Boris Charmatz's creation 10000 Gestes, a creation with architect François Perrin for the Performa Biennial in New York, and a duet with artist and musician Kim Gordon. Since 2021, Studio Dimitri Chamblas has been supported by the French Ministry of Culture.

As part of the LA Phil program, Chamblas directed Crowd out, a 1,000-singer opera by David Lang in June 2019. This monumental opera took place at the Walt Disney Concert Hall in Los Angeles and was presented once again in April 2023 at the Berlioz Opera in Montpellier.

That same year, he creates alongside Kim Gordon, founder of the rock band Sonic Youth, a duet that was presented at the American Swedish Institute as part of the Liquid Music Festival in Minneapolis, at the Louvre Museum in Paris, France, and at MOCA Geffen in Los Angeles. Chamblas also made his acting debut, playing the lead in Alex Prager's film Play the Wind alongside actress Riley Keough.

In 2019, Chamblas began a new project within a Los Angeles County prison in Lancaster, California. This was the first time in the United States that contemporary dance entered a men's maximum security prison. Ten inmates incarcerated from 30 years to life were grouped and went on to create a dance performance together. Several articles, reports, and a film (Dancing in a Yard) were made about the project.

== Selected performances ==
- 1994: Les Disparates
- 1993: À bras-le-corps
- 2017: The Environment Bubble
- 2018: The floor
- 2018: Slow Show
- 2018: Kim and Dim
- 2019: Self - Portrait
- 2019: Crowd Out
- 2019: Unlimited Bodies
- 2022: Water and Power
- 2023: Slow Show Installation
- 2023: takemehome

== Recognition ==
- Knight of the Order of Arts and Letters (2019)
