= Blight (album) =

2025 studio album by the Antlers

Studio album by the Antlers
- Released: October 10, 2025
- Studio: Field's Edge (Ulster County, New York)
- Length: 45:05
- Label: Transgressive
- Producer: Peter Silberman

The Antlers chronology
Green to Gold (2021)	Blight (2025)

Singles from Blight
- 1. "Carnage" Released: July 29, 2025; 2. "Something in the Air" Released: September 4, 2025

Blight is the seventh studio album by American indie rock group the Antlers. It was released on October 10, 2025, on Transgressive Records. The album was inspired by singer Peter Silberman's walks through the fields surrounding his home recording studio, featuring lyrics relating to climate change.

== Background ==
The album was announced on July 29, 2025, along with the release of the first single from the album, "Carnage". A second single, "Something in the Air", was released on September 4, 2025.

Blight was written between 2021 and 2024. Silberman stated that the album was inspired by recording sessions at Field's Edge, his home studio in Ulster County, New York, and his walks in the surrounding fields. He says he began to get in touch with "the ways that nature is under threat".

== Music and lyrics ==
The album's lyrics focus on the passive nature of destructive human behavior, with particular focus on the unconscious ways we cause pollution, waste, and ruin to the natural world. Peter Silberman stated "Carnage" is about "a kind of violence we rarely acknowledge—violence not born of cruelty, but of convenience. Innocent creatures are swept up in the path of destruction as their world collides with ours, and we barely notice".

Silberman stated: "Whereas my past lyrics dealt in extended metaphors, Blight takes a more direct approach. The consequences of accelerating technology and environmental neglect feel imminent; that sense of urgency made me want to speak more candidly. The present-day specifics are so unsettling, and tomorrow's possibilities are so surreal... there's no need to mince words."

A second single from the album, "Something in the Air", was released on September 4, with lyrics that fit the album's general theme of climate change. According to Silberman, the song is about "a looming threat that can take many forms... Precautions that would have seemed strange a decade ago have become ordinary routines – a new normal set against a backdrop of creeping dread. Meanwhile, doom lies dormant, waiting to erupt".

== Critical reception ==
Professional ratings
Aggregate scores
Source	Rating
Metacritic	77/100
Review scores
Source	Rating
AllMusic	3.5/5 stars
Mojo	3/5 stars
musicOMH	4/5 stars
Paste	7.9/10
Record Collector	4/5 stars
Sputnikmusic	4.5/5 stars
Uncut	8/10

Blight was met with favorable reviews from music critics. At Metacritic, which assigns a normalized rating out of 100 to reviews from professional publications, the album received an average score of 77, based on 8 reviews.

Record Collector's Kevin Harley gave the album a 4 out of 5 star rating, writing, "Poised and exquisitely crafted, Blight's mediations on the effects of human actions are delivered with a gentle sincerity that disarms cynicism." Eric R. Danton of Paste praised the album's restraint and the "frequently gorgeous" arrangements, writing, "Silberman manages not to sound doctrinaire or heavy-handed on these nine songs, even as he quietly excoriates a culture of convenience that has chosen to overlook the consequences of next-day delivery and cheap mass-production."

== Track listing ==
All lyrics are written by Peter Silberman; all music is composed by Silberman and Michael Lerner.

Blight track listing
No.	Title	Length
1.	"Consider the Source"	5:58
2.	"Pour"	5:45
3.	"Carnage"	4:41
4.	"Blight"	5:10
5.	"Something in the Air"	5:39
6.	"Deactivate"	7:22
7.	"Calamity"	3:30
8.	"A Great Flood"	3:24
9.	"They Lost All of Us"	3:36
Total length:		45:05

== Personnel ==
Credits adapted from Tidal.

=== The Antlers ===
- Peter Silberman – piano, synthesizer, production, engineering (all tracks); vocals (tracks 1–8), baritone guitar (1–4, 7), acoustic guitar (2, 5–7), 12-string guitar (2); electric guitar, Rhodes (3, 4)
- Michael Lerner – drums

=== Additional contributors ===
- Nicholas Principe – mixing
- Gus Elg – mastering
- Pete Caigan – engineering

== Charts ==
Chart performance for Blight
Chart (2025)	Peak position
UK Album Downloads (Official Charts)	69
