= Hospice (album) =

Studio album by The Antlers
- Released: March 23, 2009
- Recorded: July 2007 – August 2008
- Studio: Watcher's Woods, Brooklyn
- Genre: Indie rock; sadcore; dream pop; post-rock
- Length: 51:47
- Label: Frenchkiss
- Producer: The Antlers

The Antlers chronology
In the Attic of the Universe (2007)	Hospice (2009)	Burst Apart (2011)

Singles from Hospice
- 1. "Bear" Released: April 2009; 2. "Two" Released: June 22, 2009; 3. "Sylvia" Released: March 22, 2010

Hospice is the third studio album by American indie rock band The Antlers, and their first concept album. It was initially self-distributed by the band in March 2009, and was eventually remastered and re-released once they signed to Frenchkiss Records in August of the same year.

== Concept ==
Set in New York City's Memorial Sloan Kettering Cancer Center, which the second track is named after, Hospice tells the story of a relationship between a hospice worker and a female patient suffering from terminal bone cancer, their ensuing romance, and their slow downward spiral as a result of the woman's traumas, fears, and disease. The story of her deterioration also serves as a metaphor for an abusive relationship. Frontman Peter Silberman has been reluctant to divulge explicit details regarding the meaning of the record, and the extent to which it is autobiographical.

== Release ==
Before the release of Hospice, the band recorded and released a 3-song EP titled "New York Hospitals" through their MySpace page in June 2008. While two songs from the EP were covers of songs by Magnetic Fields and Yo La Tengo, the song "Sylvia (An Introduction)" acts as a prologue to the events in Hospice, with the titular character and melody of the song becoming a recurring motif throughout the album.

The first single was "Bear", released in April 2009 to promote the self-released version of Hospice. "Two" was the first single released commercially, as a digital download in June 2009. The song's music video features a combination of photography and cutout animation, and was directed by Ethan Segal and Albert Thrower. In the United Kingdom, "Bear" was released on 7-inch vinyl on November 16, 2009, featuring an exclusive remix of "Bear" by Darby Cicci on the B-side. Additionally, an exclusive live recording of "Sylvia" at The Orchard in New York City was released as a download on November 17, 2009. "Sylvia" was issued as the third proper single on March 22, 2010. A music video was produced for the song, directed by Trey Hock, and premiered on the IFC's website on April 15, 2010.

=== Reissue and 10th anniversary tour ===
On March 8, 2019, The Antlers reissued Hospice via Frenchkiss/Transgressive. The reissue was pressed on double white vinyl and featured updated artwork and packaging from artist Zan Goodman. The same year, The Antlers embarked on a 10th anniversary tour, playing the album in its entirety. However, Silberman's health concerns led them to perform acoustic versions of the songs during intimate shows in smaller venues. These were the band's first live performances since 2015. The tour officially marked the departure of multi-instrumentalist Darby Cicci.

On February 14, 2025, the band released Hospice at Ten: Live in Chicago, a live album recorded at Thalia Hall in Chicago on April 5 and 6, 2019. It was released exclusively through Bandcamp, as a double LP or digital download.

== Reception ==
Professional ratings
Aggregate scores
Source	Rating
AnyDecentMusic?	7.8/10
Metacritic	83/100
Review scores
Source	Rating
AllMusic	4/5 stars
The A.V. Club	A−
The Daily Telegraph	5/5 stars
The Guardian	4/5 stars
The Irish Times	4/5 stars
NME	8/10
Pitchfork	8.5/10
Q	4/5 stars
Spin	7/10
Uncut	4/5 stars

The album was released to critical acclaim. Pitchfork endorsed the re-release of Hospice with their "Best New Music" stamp. NPR Music placed the album at number one on their list of the top ten albums of early 2009. At the end of the year, Pitchfork placed it number 37 on their list of the best albums of 2009, praising its "power to emotionally destroy listeners." Beats Per Minute named it the best album of 2009, while Rhapsody deemed it the 24th best album of 2009.

It sold 13,000 copies in the United States by October 9, according to Nielsen SoundScan.

== Track listing ==
All songs written by Peter Silberman. In the liner notes, all songs are given alternate titles.

No.	Title	Alternate title	Length
1.	"Prologue"	Hospice	2:35
2.	"Kettering"	Bedside Manner	5:10
3.	"Sylvia"	Sliding Curtains Shining Children's Heads	5:27
4.	"Atrophy"	Rings Ill-Fitting	7:40
5.	"Bear"	Children Become Their Parents Become Their Children	3:54
6.	"Thirteen"	Sylvia Speaks	3:11
7.	"Two"	I Would Have Saved Her If I Could	5:56
8.	"Shiva"	Portacaths Switched	3:45
9.	"Wake"	Letting People In	8:44
10.	"Epilogue"	Sylvia Alive In Nightmares	5:25
Total length:			51:47

== Release history ==
Country	Date	Label	Format	Catalog no.
United States	March 23, 2009	The Antlers Music	CD	7 26167-4620-2 3
United States	August 18, 2009	Frenchkiss Records	CD (remastered)	FKR041-2
United States	August 18, 2009	Frenchkiss Records	LP	FKR041-1
United Kingdom	October 19, 2009	Frenchkiss/Studio !K7	CD	FK041CD

== Credits ==
=== Personnel ===
- Peter Silberman – vocals, guitar, accordion, harmonica, harp, keyboards
- Darby Cicci – trumpet, bowed banjo
- Michael Lerner – drums, percussion
- Justin Stivers – bass
- Sharon Van Etten – vocals on "Kettering," "Thirteen," "Two," and "Shiva"

=== Production ===
- Recorded at Watcher's Woods, Brooklyn
- Mastered by Greg Calbi at Sterling Sound
- Original release mastered by Timothy Stollenwerk
- Artwork by Zan Goodman
- Design by Darby Cicci
