= Undersea (EP) =

EP by The Antlers
- Released: July 24, 2012
- Genres: Indie rock; dream pop
- Length: 22:30
- Labels: ANTI-; Transgressive Records

The Antlers chronology
Burst Apart (2011)	Undersea (2012)	Familiars (2014)

Professional ratings
Review scores
Source	Rating
Consequence of Sound	3.5/5 stars
Paste	(8/10)
Pitchfork	(8.1/10)
Under the Radar	7/10 stars

Undersea is an EP by American indie rock band The Antlers, released in 2012 on ANTI- and Transgressive Records.

== Track listing ==
No.	Title	Length
1.	"Drift Dive"	4:48
2.	"Endless Ladder"	8:29
3.	"Crest"	3:42
4.	"Zelda"	5:31
Total length:		22:30
