= Urs Fischer (artist) =

Swiss installation artist (born 1973)

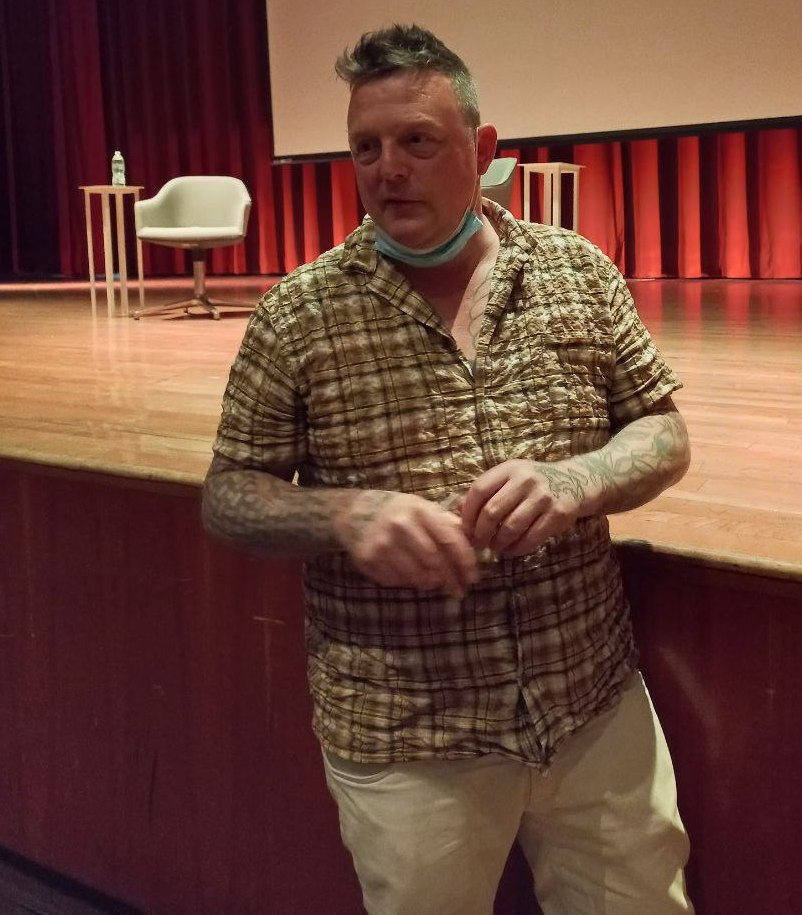
- Born: 1973 (age 52–53); Zürich, Switzerland
- Known for: Artist
- Website: ursfischer.com

Urs Fischer (born 1973) is a Swiss-born contemporary visual artist living in New York City and Los Angeles. Fischer’s practice includes sculpture, installation, photography, and digitally-mediated images.

== Early life and education ==
Born to two doctors as the second of two children in 1973, Fischer studied at the Schule für Gestaltung in Zurich, Switzerland. After the basic, first-year course in art and design, he enrolled in the school's photography department, and supported himself by working as a bouncer at Zurich night clubs and house parties.

== Career ==
Fischer moved to Amsterdam, The Netherlands, in 1993, aged 19, and had his first solo show at a gallery in Zurich in 1996. He later lived in London, Los Angeles, and Berlin, before moving to New York City. In Berlin and New York, he shared studios with fellow artist Rudolf Stingel.

In 2009 Fischer's studio occupied a large warehouse in the Red Hook section of Brooklyn, near the waterfront. In 2019 he had a studio in the Frogtown neighborhood of Los Angeles.

== Style ==
Fischer works across sculpture, photography, drawing, painting, publishing, and digital art. The artist employs a variety of materials and processes in his work, including novel computation systems and artificial intelligence, resulting in an oeuvre that “resists easy classification”. His subversive, metaphysical approach to art is often considered to be influenced by anti-art movements like Neo-Dada, Lost Art, or the Situationist International. Since Fischer began showing his work in Europe in the mid-1990s, he has produced an enormous number of objects, drawings, collages, and room-size installations. Fischer has been described by the arts and culture magazine Vault as “internationally celebrated” and one of the most significant contemporary artists working today, with global sale prices reaching up to $6.8 million.

== Previous work (1996–2020) ==
=== 1996–2000 ===
In 1996, Fischer had his first solo exhibition at Galerie Walcheturm, Zurich. In 1999, he was selected to be an artist-in-residence at Delfina Foundation in London, alongside Keith Tyson, Mark Wallinger, and Sonia Boyce.

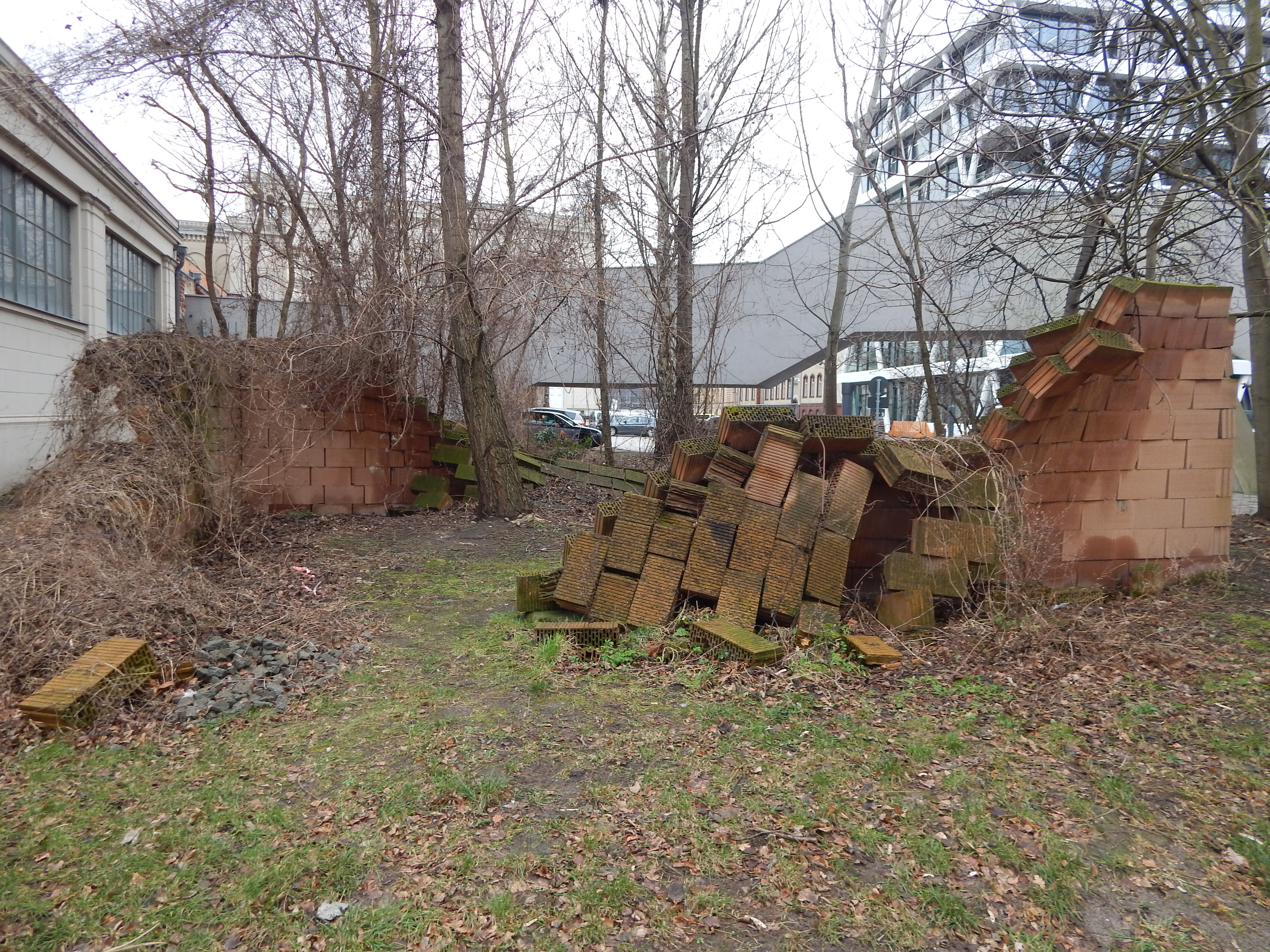
Baked Master's Basket, 1999/2005, Berlin, Nationalgalerie

=== 2001–2006 ===
In 2002, Fischer had his first institutional show in the US at the Santa Monica Museum of Art, which included an early wax sculpture, What Should an Owl Do with a Fork.

=== 2007–2010 ===
In 2010, Fischer released a publication with fellow artist Darren Bader, titled The Bearded Island / The Artists Lament. The publication was a parallel project to the 2009 group exhibition “Remembering Henry’s Show” at the Brant Foundation in Greenwich, Connecticut. The text is a close examination of the fear and obsessions that pervade the life of an artist, set against a series of images.

In Death of a Moment (2007), two entire walls are equipped with floor-to-ceiling mirrors and set in motion by a hydraulic system, to create the surreal effect of a room in flux, morphing in shape and size.

=== 2011–2017 ===
==== Untitled 2011 ====
In 2011, Fischer created a to-scale wax reproduction of The Rape of the Sabine Women by Flemish-Italian sculptor Giambologna for the Venice Biennale. The sculpture was produced at the Swiss foundry, The Kunstgiesserei. Giambologna's original work in the Piazza della Signoria was digitized using an optical scanner, and the image was used to create a 3D model in polyurethane foam. A negative was made from the foam model, and filled with wax that was pigmented to imitate the effect of marble. A wick system was developed to allow the work, Untitled 2011, to melt like a candle for the duration of the Biennale. The exhibition included another wax sculpture of Fischer’s friend and fellow artist Rudolf Stringel and a wax creation of Fischer’s own office chair. The work was described as a highlight of the Venice Biennale by Vault magazine.

Problem Paintings

In 2012, Fischer exhibited his first show at Gagosian, “Beds & Problem Paintings”, featuring oversized vintage Hollywood publicity stills obstructed by silkscreened images of mundane objects.

"The 'problem' is that an organic or inorganic object obstructs each visage. Beets, a wrench or a banana — each obstacle is quotidian, but at this size, for some are as large as a pony, they are immediately iconic." – The New York Times Magazine

==== Kiito-San ====
In 2012, Fischer launched his own publishing imprint, Kiito-San, whose books are distributed by DAP and Buchhandlung Walther König. The imprint has published exhibition catalogues by Fischer as well as books on the work of Spencer Sweeney, Peter Regli, and Darren Bader. In 2015 Kiito-San released a cookbook called Cooking for Artists, written by Mina Stone, who cooks lunch at Fischer's studio.

=== 2018–2021 ===
==== PLAY ====
In 2018, he conceived PLAY, with choreography by Madeline Hollander, a room-size exhibit combining choreography and sculpture in which audience members can interact with robotic office chairs equipped with motion sensors and motors that move on their own and react to the actions of participants in the gallery.

==== iPad Paintings ====
That same year, Fischer started exploring painting on an iPad: “It is so much closer to playing an instrument: your direct touch transfers immediately into what it is, rather than needing to move material around.” His iPad paintings, reminiscent of David Hockney's, were exhibited at Sadie Coles HQ in London and Gagosian in Beverly Hills.

==== "SIRENS" ====
In 2019, Fischer exhibited "SIRENS" at Galerie Max Hetzler in Berlin, a series of new paintings that built upon the aesthetic of his earlier Problem Paintings, using classic Hollywood stills as a foundation to explore form, shape, and color.

==== HEADZ ====
HEADZ, which the New York Times said “resurrected the spirit of Andy Warhol’s Factory”, was a word-of-mouth weekly salon of food, music, and creativity at Spencer Sweeney’s Chinatown studio in New York City. Open to the public, guests were invited to eat, listen to improvisational music, and create their own artworks to hang on the studio walls. After nine months, when Sweeney’s lease expired, the studio walls were photographed, and Fischer recreated them 1:1 as a commemorative wallpaper that was displayed in situ as an installation in Beirut in 2020 (Fischer’s first Middle Eastern show).

==== The Intelligence of Nature ====
While being locked down in Los Angeles during the COVID pandemic, Fischer created a new series of paintings inspired by home life (including his house, garden, studio, and childhood photographs), The Intelligence of Nature, that was exhibited at Sadie Coles HQ in 2021.

== Recent work (2021–present) ==
=== CHAOS (Digital Sculptures / NFTs) ===
Throughout his career, Fischer has used digital technology to mix repurposed images with generated images. In 2021, he fully explored digital sculpture for this first time with CHAOS, a series containing 1000 digitally-scanned and recreated everyday physical objects (like an egg and a lighter) paired to interact with each other.

Released as a series of 500 individual NFTs and culminating in a capstone piece, CHAOS #501, the project took over two years to complete and involved a global team of experts in 3D modeling, animation, and motion capture. Objects were chosen by Fischer because they were "engineered, cultured or manufactured by humans."

In April 2021, CHAOS #1–#500 launched to the public via online auctions on Fair Warning and MakersPlace. CHAOS #1 sold for nearly $100,000 to an unknown buyer. In September 2022, CHAOS #501, the culmination of the series, was exhibited in the show "Denominator" at Gagosian in New York City on a state-of-the-art 14’ x 30’ micro LED wall display with .84 pixel pitch. The screen featured all 1000 digital objects interacting in a single space.

=== "Denominator" (Show) ===
At the same show, Fischer unveiled two new pieces: People, a recreation of Room 43 of the National Gallery featuring replicas of paintings from artists like Van Gogh, with clips of cutout heads of YouTube video influencers projected over it. The installation was compared to “Jeff Koons’s Gazing Ball series, where the viewer’s participation in the work becomes part of its image.” Denominator was a 12’ x 12’ cube of LED screens displaying algorithmically-generated video clips of TV commercials, stored in a new type of video database Fischer designed with software engineers.

“The result is a strange fusion of images, showing time and value systems broken down by new modes of processing. Rather than building an interpretive structure for these images that explores their meaning and understanding by human cognition, Fischer instead lets the code do what it will, and allows new interpretations to emerge instead… It’s as if Fischer were asking what the meaning of an audience is in the modern era, and even, perhaps, if that audience needs to be human.”

=== UF (Clothing Line) ===
In late 2022, Fischer launched his clothing line, UF, at the Jeffrey Deitch Gallery in New York City.

== Notable works ==
=== Untitled (Bread House) ===
In Untitled (Bread House) (2004–2005), Fischer constructed a Swiss style chalet out of loaves of bread. The first version of the work was realized in 2004 through a collaboration with peer and curator Hugo Markl, who facilitated its public installation in Vienna, Austria. His Bad Timing, Lamb Chop! (2004–2005), displays a giant wooden chair (actually cast aluminium) intersecting a half-empty packet of cigarettes dramatically increased in scale.

=== Untitled (Lamp / Bear) ===
Between 2005 and 2006, he created Untitled (Lamp / Bear), an edition of three 23-foot-tall, 20-ton, bronze bears (two are yellow, the third is blue) intersected with generic functional lamps that appear to spring out of their heads; in 2011, one of the pieces was displayed for five months at Seagram Building's plaza before being auctioned at Christie's, where Jose Mugrabi sold it for $6 million. It is currently displayed at Hamad International Airport in Doha, Qatar. The blue version, affectionately known as "Blueno," was installed at Brown University in Providence, Rhode Island from 2016 to 2020.

=== You ===
For his 2007 show at Gavin Brown's Enterprise in New York, Fischer excavated the gallery's main room, bringing in contractors to dig an eight-foot hole where the floor had been, and calling the result You. The work was described by art critic Jerry Saltz as “experimentally rich, buzzing with energy and entropy, crammed with chaos and contradiction.”

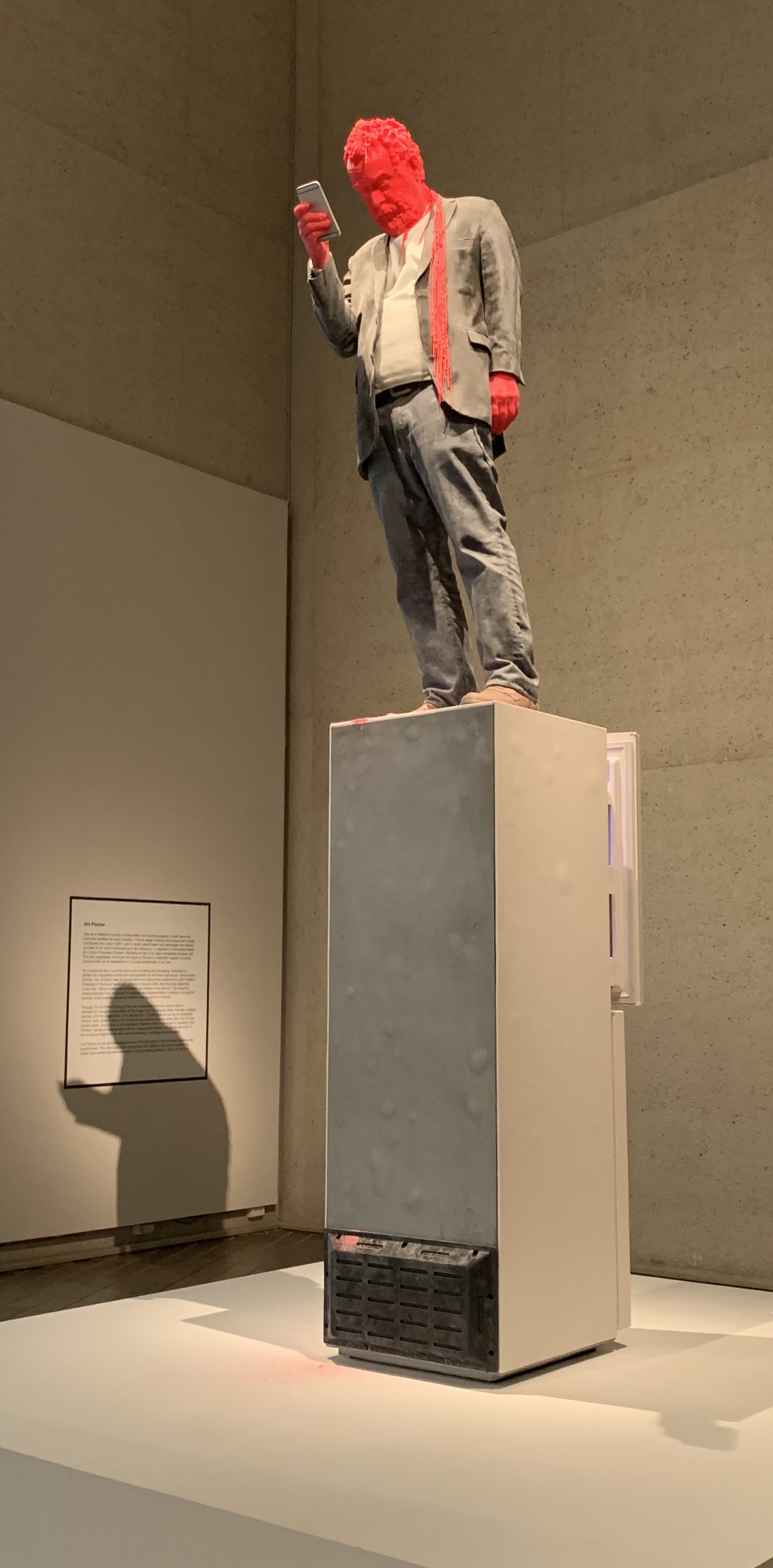
Urs Fischer's Francesco 2017 on display at the National Gallery of Australia, Canberra, April 2019.

=== Wax Sculptures ===
Fischer’s temporary art wax sculptures have become iconic of the artist’s practice. Fischer began making wax sculptures in the early 2000s, resulting in anonymous and crudely cut female forms. Today, his wax sculptures are refined portraits of significant art world figures that are lit like candles and melted over the duration of an exhibition. The wax works are almost exclusively sculptural portraits of human subjects, and the process of melting lends itself to contemplation of existentialism and the ultimate meaning of art and its legacy.

Francesco 2017 is a four-metre tall wax sculpture of the Italian curator Francesco Bonami, a close personal friend of the artist. The National Gallery of Australia acquired Francesco in 2018, the first acquisition under the leadership of new director Nick Mitzevich. It is the first work of Fischer’s to be accessioned into a collection in the southern hemisphere.

Francesco 2017 depicts Bonami atop an open refrigerator stacked with fruit and vegetables. The refrigerator acts as a plinth, a satire of sculpture's elevation of important men on marble plinths. The figure stares at his smartphone, in a position “emblematic of our era”. The melting wax and fruit and vegetables in the fridge are a reference to memento mori of seventeenth-century Dutch painting, where motifs such as food, candles, hourglasses and skulls are utilised as a reminder of mortality. The artist sets no strict parameters for the burning of the sculpture. Wicks are inserted at various locations on the work; all the wicks can be lit at once to accelerate the process or the life of the work can be extended by limiting the number of wicks lit at once. The work can be lit continuously or sporadically. Once the figure has melted completely, the remains will be returned to the Swiss foundry where it was made to be recast and returned to the museum for the next installation.

Mitzevich described the acquisition to The Australian as “[embodying] what this generation of art is about”. In another interview with the Canberra Times, Mitzevich says that the sculpture demonstrates that contemporary art “is not static, it is alive and always changing, reflecting the world in which we live”.

== Exhibitions ==
Fischer’s first large-scale solo exhibition was Kir Royal in 2004 at the Kunsthaus Zurich in 2004.

Fischer’s first solo exhibition in an American museum was ‘Urs Fischer: Marguerite de Ponty, exhibited across three floors of the New Museum in 2009. The exhibition, curated by the artist, featured “immersive installations and hallucinatory environments." Despite the expansive survey of Fischer’s sculptural and installation works, the exhibition was described as “elegant and breathtakingly spare”, and was well received by critics.

In 2012, the Palazzo Grassi exhibited a retrospective of Fischer’s work, conceived by the artist and curator Caroline Bourgeois. The exhibition was a restaging of the artist’s London studio, and included a survey of models, sketches, notes, furnishings and works of art. Fischer was the first living artist to receive a monographic exhibition at the Palazzo Grassi.

In 2013, MOCA undertook a huge retrospective of Fischer’s work across its two locations, The Geffen Contemporary and MOCA Grand Avenue. This included curation of Fischer’s own works as well as physical interventions in the space such as You 2007, where the artist has cut huge holes out of the museum wall, and an interactive piece Yes 2013 that consisted of many ‘sculptural experiments’ in clay created by visitors to the exhibition. Michelle Kuo, writing for Artforum, described the interventions as a challenge to the “staid and uniform” methods of contemporary curation. Coverage in the Los Angeles times was more critical, commenting that Fischer’s work was largely derivative of artists that came before, such as Robert Gober, Marcel Duchamp and Bruce Nauman; and that the art world satire felt hollow considering that the vast majority of works were loaned from private galleries and collections.

Fischer's installations and sculptures have been exhibited in some group exhibitions and biennales worldwide, including Manifesta 3 and the Venice Biennale in 2003, 2007, and 2011. His solo exhibition at the Kunsthaus Zürich in 2004, titled "Kir Royal," was his first large-scale solo museum exhibition. Recent major exhibitions include "Not My House Not My Fire," Espace 315, Centre Pompidou, Paris (2004); "Mary Poppins," Blaffer Gallery, Art Museum of the University of Houston, Houston, Texas (2006); "Urs Fischer: Marguerite de Ponty," New Museum of Contemporary Art, New York (2009–10); "Skinny Sunrise", Kunsthalle Wien, Vienna (2012); "Madame Fisscher," Palazzo Grassi, Venice (2012); "Urs Fischer," Museum of Contemporary Art, Los Angeles (2013); and "YES," Deste Foundation Project Space, Hydra, Greece (2013); “Play,” Gagosian West 21st Street, New York, 2018, “Maybe,” The Modern Institute, Glasgow (2018); “Dasha,” Gagosian, Davies Street, London (2018); “Big Clay #4 and 2 Tuscan Men,” Piazza della Signoria, Florence (2017); “The Public & the Private,” Legion of Honour Museum, San Francisco (2017); “SIRENS,” Galerie Max Hetzler (2019); and “Images,” Gagosian, Beverly Hills (2019).

In April 2022, Fischer opened his first institutional exhibition in Latin America at the Museo Jumex in Mexico City. New candle works created for the exhibition features artists Spencer Sweeney, Kembra Pfahler, art dealer Esthella Provas, and founder Eugenio López Alonso. The exhibition was curated by Francesco Bonami. He won the GNMH AWARD in 2016.

== Critical response ==
A 2009 New Yorker profile said, “Fischer’s own art, like Fischer himself, is highly memorable but hard to pin down.” The New York Times highlighted the forward-thinking nature of his work: “Implicitly Duchampian yet marvelously experiential, these pieces have seemed to signal the end of installation art, like monochrome paintings sometimes seem to forewarn the end of painting.”

== Personal life ==
Since the early 2000s and as of 2019, Fischer has been living in a 1920s home in the Solano Canyon neighborhood of Los Angeles. He previously also lived in New York's Greenwich Village.

Fischer was in a relationship with Cassandra MacLeod and a daughter was born of the relationship.

In late 2014, Fischer married Tara Subkoff. Fischer and Subkoff share a daughter, Grace. They divorced in 2016.

== Bibliography ==
- Adam McEwen, Urs Fischer: Beds and Problem Paintings (New York: Rizzoli), 2012
- Caroline Bourgeois, Patricia Falguières, Michele Robecchi, Urs Fischer: Madame Fisscher (New York: Kiito-San), 2012
- Bice Curiger, Massimiliano Gioni, Jessica Morgan, Urs Fischer: Shovel in a Hole (Zurich: JRP Ringier), 2009
- Garrick Jones, Brice Marden, Beatrix Ruf, Urs Fischer: Good Small Make-Up Tree (Zurich: JRP Ringier), 2005
- Bruce Hainley, Jörg Heiser, Mirjam Varadinis, Urs Fischer: Kir Royal (Zurich: JRP Ringier), 2005
