= In the Attic of the Universe =

Studio album by The Antlers
- Released: March 26, 2007
- Genre: Indie rock, indie folk
- Length: 26:42
- Label: Fall Records

The Antlers chronology
Uprooted (2006)	In the Attic of the Universe (2007)	Hospice (2009)

Professional ratings
Review scores
Source	Rating
Allmusic	4/5 stars
Sputnikmusic	4/5 stars

In the Attic of the Universe is the second studio album by American indie rock group The Antlers, when the Antlers name was still a solo project of vocalist and guitarist Peter Silberman. It was recorded by Silberman alone between September 2006 and March 2007, and released online for free download from The Antlers website in March 2007. An official CD was produced under the Fall Records label and was released on November 6, 2007, making it the first Antlers album to be released with the help of a record label.

When commenting on the album, Silberman noted that the album was recorded at a low point in his life, when he was able to find comfort in his fascination with the universe. This fascination led to the album's recurring theme of the universe and its vastness. Silberman also noted that the album carries a theme of "religious misdirection", inspired by his own tendency to find the wrong solutions to his problems in life.

As with the full band debut album (and follow-up recording to In the Attic of the Universe) Hospice, there is a recurring riff that occurs in "Look!" and "The Universe is Going to Catch You".

== Track listing ==
All tracks are written by Peter Silberman.

No.	Title	Length
1.	"In the Attic"	5:02
2.	"Look!"	1:47
3.	"On the Roof"	3:46
4.	"Shh!"	3:16
5.	"The Universe is Going to Catch You"	3:54
6.	"The Carrying Arms"	1:48
7.	"In the Snow"	2:31
8.	"Stairs to the Attic"	4:38
Total length:		26:42
