= Burst Apart =

Studio album by The Antlers
- Released: May 10, 2011
- Recorded: Watcher's Woods, Brooklyn, September 2010 – January 2011
- Genres: Indie rock; chamber pop
- Length: 41:27
- Language: English
- Labels: Frenchkiss Records; Transgressive Records
- Producer: The Antlers

The Antlers chronology
Hospice (2009)	Burst Apart (2011)	Undersea (2012)

Singles from Burst Apart
- 1. "Parentheses" Released: April 5, 2011; 2. "I Don't Want Love" Released: May 2, 2011

Burst Apart is the fourth studio album by American indie rock group The Antlers. It was released on Frenchkiss Records on May 10, 2011, and the day before in the UK / Japan / Europe by Transgressive Records. It began streaming on the National Public Radio website on April 24, 2011. The cover art was designed by Zan Goodman, who also designed the album cover for their previous album, Hospice.

The track "Parentheses" was released as an iTunes single on April 5, 2011.

== Background ==
Frontman Peter Silberman said the band were influenced by music from Boards of Canada, Portishead, Air, Balam Acab, Cocteau Twins, OMD, the Beatles, Radiohead, and Beach House.

== Critical reception ==
Professional ratings
Aggregate scores
Source	Rating
AnyDecentMusic?	7.9/10
Metacritic	81/100
Review scores
Source	Rating
AllMusic	3.5/5 stars
The A.V. Club	A−
Consequence of Sound	4.5/5 stars
The Guardian	4/5 stars
The Independent	3/5 stars
NME	7/10
Pitchfork	8.2/10
Q	4/5 stars
Slant Magazine	4/5 stars
Spin	6/10

Upon its release, Burst Apart received highly positive reviews from most critics. It was featured on many best of the year lists of music magazines and was voted album of the year 2011 by Drowned in Sound. It currently holds a score of 81 from review aggregate website Metacritic, indicating "universal acclaim". Most critics have noted the contrast between Burst Apart and its predecessor Hospice, a highly conceptual album about a hospice worker who falls in love with a dying patient.

Pitchfork endorsed it with its "Best New Music" label; reviewer Ian Cohen remarked that although Burst Apart could not achieve the cult-like following of Hospice, it is "still tethered to a magnanimity and expressive clarity that makes it almost every bit as devastating." Jeremy Aaron of AbsolutePunk said that while the record "marks a move away from the stifling bleakness" of Hospice, it is still "an incredible sounding album", composed with "breathtaking elegance".

Marc Hawthorne of The A.V. Club likewise commented on the difference, writing that Hospice "bummed everyone out--in the best possible way," but that The Antlers were able to create a followup that "easily reaches grand, dramatic heights even while remaining relatively subdued."

== Track listing ==
No.	Title	Length
1.	"I Don't Want Love"	3:22
2.	"French Exit"	4:06
3.	"Parentheses"	3:29
4.	"No Widows"	5:20
5.	"Rolled Together"	4:40
6.	"Every Night My Teeth Are Falling Out"	3:26
7.	"Tiptoe"	2:24
8.	"Hounds"	5:19
9.	"Corsicana"	3:42
10.	"Putting the Dog to Sleep"	5:48
Total length:		41:27

iTunes Deluxe version
No.	Title	Length
11.	"Tongue Tied"	5:03
Total length:		46:30

== Personnel ==
- Peter Silberman: Vocals, lyrics, guitar, mandolin, organ
- Darby Cicci: Synthesizers, electric pianos, organ, bass, vocals, trumpet, banjo
- Michael Lerner: Drums, percussion
- Engineered by Darby Cicci
- Mixed by The Antlers and Dan Seiders
- Mastered by Greg Calbi, Sterling Sound
- Cover design by Zan Goodman
- Cover photo by Justin Hollar
- Additional Design by Zan Goodman, Darby Cicci
