= Madeline Hollander =

American artist and choreographer

- Born: Los Angeles, California, United States
- Education: Barnard College of Columbia University, Bard College Milton Avery Graduate School of the Arts
- Website: www.madelinehollander.com

Madeline Hollander is an American artist, choreographer, and dancer. Her work explores the evolution of human body movement and the intersection between choreography and visual art.

== Early life and education ==
Madeline Hollander was born in 1986 in Los Angeles, California. While growing up, she trained with Yvonne Mounsey and danced professionally with both the Los Angeles Ballet and Angel Corella's Barcelona Ballet. She received a B.A. degree from Barnard College of Columbia University in 2008 and attended the MFA program at Bard College's Milton Avery Graduate School of the Arts from 2016 to 2019.

== Artistic practice ==
Since 2012, Madeline Hollander has been developing her Gesture Archive, a longitudinal video research project on human movement. Her performances have been lauded for their architecture and connection to "classical craft." She has also worked as a choreographer in collaboration with other artists and as a movement consultant in Jordan Peele's Us.

As a performer, Hollander has developed an organic system of color codes and pictographs to recall her choreography, which is understood only by herself and her dancers. She seeks inspiration from varied sources, including interface design, sports referee gestures, and building evacuation procedures.

=== Heads/Tails ===
The "Heads/Tails" work is Hollander's first major exhibition without human actors. Instead, the installation consists of used automobile lights, which are synchronized with the traffic signals of a nearby intersection. The light effects are modeled to reflect the behaviors of various New York City drivers.

Alongside the lights, the exhibit contains a series of watercolors, a text by A.E. Benenson on the history of New York City traffic, and a small bronze statue of Mercury. The statue is one of the 104 such statues that once adorned the tops of traffic lights in New York City from 1931 to 1964, most of which have since gone missing.

=== New Max ===
The project notes for "New Max" describe the installation as, "Performance begins at 65 degrees Fahrenheit, and dancers continuously hit a new maximum temperature each round."

=== Performances and choreography ===
- Gesture Archive: BASE (2013) - Human Resources - Los Angeles, CA
- 2014 - Futurevisions, Torrance Shipman Gallery, New York
- DRAFT (2014) - Jack Hanley Gallery - New York City
- Heimlich at SkowheganPERFORMS (2016) - Socrates Sculpture Park, New York
- In Practice: Under Foundations (2015) - SculptureCenter - New York City
- Arena (2017) - Rockaway Beach - New York City
- New Max (2018) - Artist's Institute - New York City
- Urs Fischer's PLAY (2018) - Gagosian Gallery - New York City
- Work Marathon festival (2018) - Serpentine Galleries - London
- Us (2019 film) - choreographer
- Whitney Biennial (2019) - curated by Rujeko Hockley and Jane Panetta
- Review (2021) - Performa 21 - New York City

== Grants, residencies and awards ==
- 2015 - Fountainhead Studios Artist Residency, Miami, FL
- 2015 - Choreographic Coding Lab: Motion-Bank, Center for the Art of Performance, UCLA
- 2015 - Skowhegan School of Painting and Sculpture
- 2016 - Socrates Sculpture Park Emerging Artist Fellowship
