= Familiars (album) =

Studio album by the Antlers
- Released: June 17, 2014
- Recorded: 2013–2014
- Studios: Antlercorp (Brooklyn, New York)
- Genres: Indie rock; art rock; dream pop
- Length: 53:15
- Language: English
- Labels: Anti-; Transgressive
- Producer: The Antlers

The Antlers chronology
Undersea (2012)	Familiars (2014)	Green to Gold (2021)

Singles from Familiars
- 1. "Palace" Released: March 31, 2014; 2. "Hotel" Released: May 5, 2014

Familiars is the fifth studio album by American indie rock group the Antlers. It was released on June 16, 2014, by Transgressive Records in the United Kingdom and on June 17, 2014, by Anti- in the United States.

The album was preceded by the singles "Palace" and "Hotel".

== Writing and composition ==
In an interview with Pitchfork, Silberman explained the concept of Familiars stating, "I was trying to understand attachment in this record. We get attached to our memories, to our ideas of who we are, of who other people are. There's a buildup of thoughts about something that keeps you from seeing it as it truly is. I've been trying to clear away as much attachment as possible in the way that I think and act. Part of that is revisiting the past and letting go of things that I've unknowingly held on to for a long time. Most of the time you don't even realize you're holding onto something, it's just a quiet whisper in the back. We're very good at distracting ourselves, which is a way of escaping, but there's no real way to escape yourself in the end. The more you try to escape yourself the more you'll be hideously confronted by whatever you're running away from, so I think it's better to face it head on."

== Critical reception ==
Professional ratings
Aggregate scores
Source	Rating
AnyDecentMusic?	7.7/10
Metacritic	82/100
Review scores
Source	Rating
AllMusic	4/5 stars
The A.V. Club	A−
Consequence of Sound	B+
Exclaim!	9/10
The Guardian	4/5 stars
Mojo	4/5 stars
NME	8/10
Paste	8.9/10
Pitchfork	7.8/10
PopMatters	9/10

Familiars received wide acclaim from most music critics. At Metacritic, which assigns a normalized rating out of 100 to reviews from music critics, the album received an average score of 82, which indicates "universal acclaim", based on 27 reviews. Pitchfork Media gave the album a 7.8 rating, indicating "Familiars is the latest satisfying effort from a band that continues to reward those listeners who give them the attention their elegant, secretly weird music deserves."

== Track listing ==
All tracks are written by Peter Silberman.

No.	Title	Length
1.	"Palace"	5:38
2.	"Doppelgänger"	7:05
3.	"Hotel"	5:01
4.	"Intruders"	5:25
5.	"Director"	6:14
6.	"Revisited"	7:42
7.	"Parade"	5:12
8.	"Surrender"	6:16
9.	"Refuge"	4:57
Total length:		53:15

== Release history ==
Country	Date	Label	Format
United Kingdom	June 16, 2014	Transgressive Records	CD
United Kingdom	June 16, 2014	Transgressive Records	LP
United Kingdom	June 16, 2014	Transgressive Records	Digital Download
United States	June 17, 2014	Anti-	CD
United States	June 17, 2014	Anti-	LP
United States	June 17, 2014	Anti-	Digital Download

== Personnel ==
The Antlers

- Peter Silberman – vocals, guitar
- Darby Cicci - trumpet, upright/electric bass, piano, rhodes, synths, organ, vocals
- Michael Lerner – drums, percussion

Additional personnel

- Brent Arnold – cello (tracks 2, 6, 9)
- Andrew Dunn – trombone (tracks 2, 9)
- Timmy Mislock – guitar (tracks 5, 6)
- Jon Natchez – trombone (tracks 4, 6, 8), euphonium, tuba, bari/tenor sax
