= The Antlers (band) =

American indie rock band

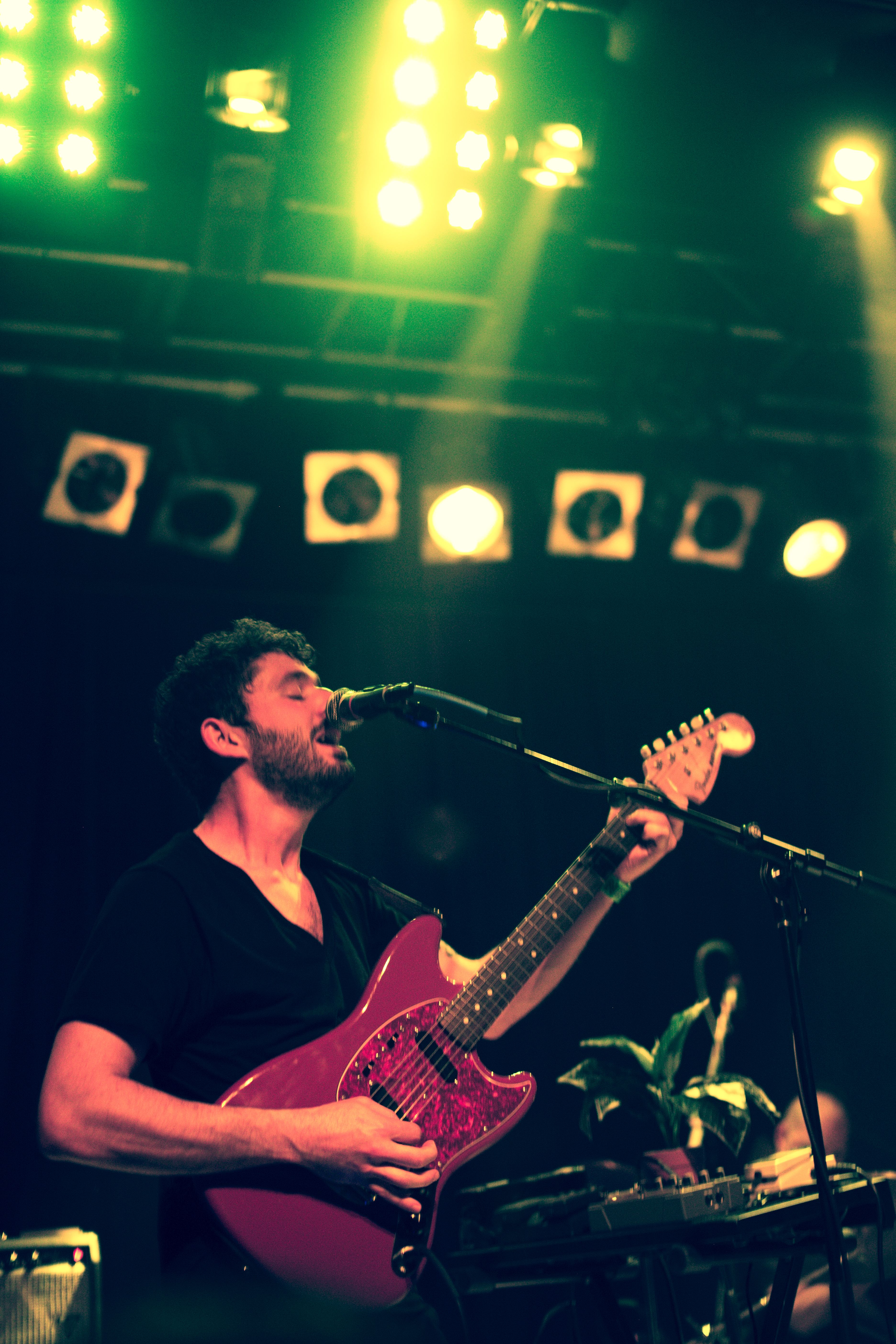
- The Antlers live at Neumos in Seattle in 2010

Background information
- Origin: New York City, U.S.
- Genres: Indie rock; indie folk; art rock; dream pop
- Years active: 2006–2015; 2019–present
- Labels: Fall; Frenchkiss; Transgressive; ANTI-
- Members: Peter Silberman; Michael Lerner
- Past members: Darby Cicci; Justin Stivers; Nicholas Shelestak
- Website: antlersmusic.com

The Antlers is an American indie rock band based in Brooklyn, New York. The band's songs are written and sung by Peter Silberman. Their music is performed by Silberman and Michael Lerner (drums). The lineup formerly featured Darby Cicci (trumpet, upright/electric bass, keyboards, synths, vocals). The band's instrumentation typically consists of vocals, electric guitar, keyboards/synths, drums and an array of other instruments including piano, horns, strings, and electronic elements. Silberman has said that the band's name is taken from The Microphones' song "Antlers".

As of 2025, the band has released seven studio albums: Uprooted (2006), In the Attic of the Universe (2007), Hospice (2009), Burst Apart (2011), Familiars (2014), Green to Gold (2021), and Blight (2025).

== History ==
=== Early history (Uprooted and In The Attic of the Universe, 2006–2007) ===
Initially, The Antlers was the solo project of vocalist and guitarist Peter Silberman, who started recording solo concept albums in 2003. Silberman eventually renamed the project to The Antlers shortly after moving to Brooklyn, New York City in late 2005. Silberman's first album, Uprooted, contained nine songs which he wrote and recorded himself. It was self-released in October 2006. The follow-up album In the Attic of the Universe was also written and recorded by Silberman. It was released for free online in March 2007 and also received a CD release in November 2007 on Fall Records.

=== Cold War and New York Hospitals (2007) ===
After the release of In the Attic of the Universe, Silberman recorded two EP's entitled Cold War and New York Hospitals, the latter featuring Michael Lerner and Sharon Van Etten as guests. Shortly thereafter, Michael Lerner and Darby Cicci came on board transforming The Antlers into a collaborative group.

=== Hospice (2009) ===
The Antlers' third full-length album, Hospice, marked the beginning of the project's shift from Silberman's solo project into its full-band incarnation, featuring significant contributions from Lerner and Cicci, as well as guest vocals by Sharon Van Etten. The band self-released the album in March 2009, selling out all of the quantities in stock. They later signed with New York City-based label Frenchkiss Records, who released a re-mastered version of Hospice on August 18, 2009. Silberman has described 'Hospice' as the story of an emotionally abusive relationship, told through the analogy of a hospice worker and a terminally-ill patient. The album received critical praise for both its narrative and musicianship, and has since been listed on several "Album of the Year" lists. The artwork for the album was designed by Zan Goodman.

=== Burst Apart and (together) EP (2011) ===
In 2011, The Antlers released their fourth studio album Burst Apart on May 10 through Frenchkiss Records in the United States and on May 9 through Transgressive Records in the UK, Europe and Japan. The album was met with mostly positive reviews from musical publications and was regarded as a successful growth from their previous release 'Hospice'. The record received praise from well-regarded publications such as New York Times, The Guardian, Under The Radar, and Pitchfork who gave it the endorsement of their 'Best New Music' category. The artwork for Burst Apart was designed by Darby Cicci and Zan Goodman.

On November 22, The Antlers released an EP entitled (together). The 8 song EP consists of remixes, and alternate versions of songs from 'Burst Apart'. The EP features collaborations with a number of different artists including Bear in Heaven, Neon Indian, and Nicole Atkins. Along with the alternate versions from Burst Apart, the EP also features a cover of The xx's "VCR", a remix by PVT, and a new song featuring Cicci on vocals. The artwork for this EP was designed by Darby Cicci.

=== Undersea EP (2012) ===
On July 24, 2012, The Antlers released a four-song EP entitled Undersea on ANTI- in the US and Transgressive Records in the UK/Europe. This 4 song EP has been described by the band as an imitation of "the serenity of drifting off to sleep or sinking to the bottom of the ocean." The record received widespread critical acclaim, with Pitchfork stating that the band's "mutually reliant interplay has never been stronger than it is here." Darby Cicci designed the artwork for the EP.

=== Familiars (2014) ===
The band's fifth full-length studio album entitled Familiars was released on June 17, 2014, via ANTI- in the US and Transgressive in the U.K./Europe. The album was recorded and produced by the band in their Brooklyn based studio, and mixed by Chris Coady. On March 31, 2014, after releasing a cryptic video teaser the week prior, the band announced the release of the nine-track album along with a music video to the album's first single "Palace". The video was directed by Hana Tajima. Darby Cicci designed the artwork for the album.

Familiars received rave reviews from publications such as Rolling Stone, who commented that "Familiars finds the Antlers on a new, magnificent level of heavy songwriting." Many critics alluded to the growth of The Antler's artistic approach on the album. MOJO called the work "another existentially-minded beauty...turning agony into something approaching ecstasy." Loud and Quiet commented on the record's success: "Slow-burning, poised and richly beautiful... The Antlers have been responsible for a handful of the most soul-shifting moments in guitar-based indie rock over the last few years, and this should see the band cement their place in the genre's upper echelons."

=== Hiatus (2015–2019) ===
Shortly after the release of Familiars, Silberman experienced hearing loss. He was unsure he could continue making music, and left Brooklyn in 2015 to a cabin in upstate New York to record a solo album, entitled Impermanence, which was released in 2017. The Antlers went on a hiatus. However, in 2017, the band denied rumors that they had broken up, writing, "While we don't have immediate plans to make new music, we'll surely be back when the time is right."

=== Hospice reissue and anniversary tour (2019) ===
On March 8, 2019, The Antlers reissued Hospice via Frenchkiss/Transgressive. The reissue was pressed on double white vinyl and featured updated artwork and packaging from artist Zan Goodman. The same year, The Antlers embarked on a 10th anniversary tour, playing the album in its entirety. However, Silberman's health concerns led them to perform acoustic versions of the songs during intimate shows in smaller venues. It was the band's first live performances since 2015. The tour officially marked the departure of multi-instrumentalist Darby Cicci.

=== Green to Gold and Losing Light EP (2021) ===
The band's sixth studio album Green to Gold was released on March 26, 2021, by ANTI- in the US and Transgressive in the U.K./Europe. On November 16, 2021, the band announced 2022 tour dates and released an EP titled Losing Light, which features reimagined versions of four songs from Green to Gold.

=== Blight (2025) ===
The band's seventh studio album Blight was released on October 10, 2025, by Transgressive.

== Members ==
- Peter Silberman – vocals, guitar, harmonica, harp, accordion, keyboards (2006–present)
- Michael Lerner – drums, percussion (2007–present)

Past

- Darby Cicci – keyboards, trumpet, bowed banjo (2007–2019)
- Justin Stivers – bass guitar, backing vocals (2007-2008)
- Nicholas Shelestak – synthesizer, guitar, laptop (2007)

Additional

- Timothy Mislock – bass guitar, guitar (touring musician)
- Kelly Pratt – trumpet, flute, keyboards (touring musician)

== Festivals and performances ==
In 2014, The Antlers performed at MusicfestNW and Hellow Festival in Monterrey, Mexico. In 2013, The Antlers performed at such festivals as First City Festival, Festival Centro in Colombia, and Formoz Festival in Taipei. In 2012, they performed at Bonnaroo, Lowlands, All Tomorrow's Parties, Untapped, End of the Road Festival, Pukkelpop in Belgium, OFF in Poland, and many others. Prior to this, the band performed at Austin City Limits festival, Sasquatch, and Great Escape in 2011, and Primavera Sound Festival, Osheaga Festival, and Lollapalooza in 2010. They also toured in support of The National for a number of dates in June 2010.

In fall 2015, The Antlers ended a worldwide tour in support of Familiars. The tour began in June 2014 with performances across the US, Europe and Australia. Some of these performances included the Perth International Arts Festival, Arcosanti, and Standon Calling. The Antlers joined Death Cab for Cutie on tour in 2015, as well as a handful of dates with Spoon. In spring 2019, The Antlers toured across the US and Europe in celebration of the tenth anniversary of the album, Hospice.

== Television appearances ==
The Antlers appeared on The Tonight Show with Jay Leno on June 23, 2011, performing their song "Every Night My Teeth Are Falling Out" from the album 'Burst Apart'. They also appeared on Late Night with Jimmy Fallon on September 6, 2011, performing the song "I Don't Want Love" also from 'Burst Apart'.

== Soundtrack ==
- "Kettering" from Hospice has been used several times in film and television, including in episode one from the first season of the Netflix show Sense8, in a scene starring Joseph Mawle as Nyx and Tuppence Middleton as Riley Blue; in the 2014 Sundance Film Festival indie film Camp X-Ray, in a scene starring Kristen Stewart as Cole and Peyman Moaadi as Ali; in episode 10 from season one of The CW post-apocalyptic series The 100; in episode 13 of Season 3 of Chuck; and across the closing scene of the first season of AMC's spin-off series Fear the Walking Dead. Sports beverage company Lucozade have featured this track on an advert documenting the rise of Heavy Weight boxer Anthony Joshua prior to his bout with Wladimir Klitschko. It was recently used in the season final of New Amsterdam and the last episode of the Netflix show Painkiller.
- "Drift Dive" from the Undersea EP is featured in the 2015 film The Age of Adaline, in a scene starring Blake Lively as Adaline and Michiel Huisman as Ellis.
- "Rolled Together" from Burst Apart was played in the closing scene of episode fifteen from the second season of the USA Network show, Suits.
- "Corsicana" from Burst Apart was featured in episode three from the fourth season of the USA Network show Suits.

== Discography ==
=== Studio albums ===
- Uprooted (2006)
- In the Attic of the Universe (2007)
- Hospice (2009)
- Burst Apart (2011)
- Familiars (2014)
- Green to Gold (2021)
- Blight (2025)
