= Uprooted (The Antlers album) =

Studio album by The Antlers
- Released: October 10, 2006
- Genre: Indie rock, indie folk
- Length: 33:51
- Label: Self-Released

The Antlers chronology
| Uprooted (2006) | In the Attic of the Universe (2007) |

Uprooted is the debut studio album by indie rock group The Antlers. The album was self-released online in 2006.

Peter Silberman has stated that, when he began the band as a solo project, his approach to home recording and production was largely inspired by the techniques of lo-fi musician Phil Elverum (The Microphones and Mount Eerie); in particular, those of the critically acclaimed 2001 release, The Glow Pt. 2. As a result, this influence can be heard throughout parts of the album, as well as on later works such as In the Attic of the Universe.

== Track listing ==
All tracks are written by Peter Silberman.

| No. | Title | Length |
|---|---|---|
| 1. | "First Field" | 1:42 |
| 2. | "Keys" | 3:33 |
| 3. | "Flash Floods Don't Retreat" | 2:39 |
| 4. | "Nashua" | 4:12 |
| 5. | "It Seems Easy" | 3:24 |
| 6. | "Last Folk Song" | 1:18 |
| 7. | "Stonethrower" | 3:14 |
| 8. | "Uprooted" | 6:13 |
| 9. | "I'm Hibernating" | 3:43 |
| Total length: | | 33:51 |

== Personnel ==
- Peter Silberman - Vocals, Instruments, Engineering, Mixing
- Nick Principe - Mixing
- Duston Spear - Artwork
