= Cochlear hydrops =

Pathological condition of the inner ear

- Other names: Cochlear Meniere's Cochlear endolymphatic hydrops
- Specialty: Otolaryngology
- Symptoms: Hearing loss Ear fullness sensation Tinnitus Diplacusis (perception of sound having different pitches in each ear) Hyperacusis (intolerance to loud sounds)
- Complications: Progression to Meniere's Disease
- Duration: Variable
- Causes: Increase in inner ear fluid
- Diagnostic method: Symptoms
- Treatment: Corticosteroids, Betahistine, Antiviral drugs, Endolymphatic sac decompression

Cochlear hydrops (or cochlear Meniere's or cochlear endolymphatic hydrops) is a condition of the inner ear involving a pathological increase of fluid affecting the cochlea. This results in swelling that can lead to hearing loss or changes in hearing perception. It is a form of endolymphatic hydrops and related to Ménière's disease. Cochlear hydrops refers to a case of inner-ear hydrops that only involves auditory symptoms and does not cause vestibular issues.

== Cause and behavior ==
Cochlear hydrops refers to an increase in endolymphatic fluid in the inner ear. This build-up is either due to an overproduction or insufficient drainage of endolymph in the constant regulation of fluid in the inner ear. Usually, only one ear is affected. The root cause of the process is unclear and may vary from patient to patient, but can have auto-immune, viral, and/or allergic triggers, among others.

The build-up of endolymph creates pressure in the scala media. This causes its diameter to increase, and the vestibular membrane to curve outwards in the direction of the vestibule. The changes to the membrane can result in changes to either the hearing perception or hearing threshold of a patient.

Episodes are usually cyclical and symptoms fluctuate through time. Patients may be symptom-free between episodes, which themselves may progressively worsen, improve, or remain constant in severity or duration. For some, permanent damage occurs, and they may be left with long-term hearing loss, hearing distortion, tinnitus, and/or a feeling of fullness in the affected ear(s).

A study looking at spiral ganglion cell counts compared to hair cell counts in the inner ear of patients who had Meniere's disease found that they maintained more hair cells than spiral ganglion cells. Thus, it could be possible that hydrops affects auditory nerves more than hair cells. In contrast, a 2021 article by Richard Gacek posits that the hearing loss is actually caused by toxic nucleic acids that are released to the outer hair cells: "Since the outer hair cells (OHC) are freely surrounded by perilymph, their walls and nerve terminals are also bathed in this fluid. The few type-II spiral ganglion cells in contact with the OHC are unlikely to play a significant role in hearing loss because of their low numbers and the lack of a known connection to the central auditory pathway."

== Symptoms ==
Cochlear hydrops preferentially affects the apex of the cochlea where low-frequency sounds are interpreted. Due to the fluid imbalance in this area, parts of the cochlea are stretched or under more tension than usual, which can lead to distortions of sound, changes in pitch perception, or hearing loss, all usually in the low frequencies.

Common symptoms include:

- Low-frequency sensorineural hearing loss.
- A feeling of fullness in the ear.
- Tinnitus (ringing in the ear).
- Diplacusis (the perception of sound being a different pitch in one ear).
- Hyperacusis (an intolerance to loud sounds).
- Depression or anxiety that the condition will worsen or progress to Meniere's disease.

As with Meniere's disease, atypical, early, or mild cases may only present some symptoms.

== Diagnosis ==
Diagnosis is based on symptoms and a hearing test that documents a loss in the low and mid frequencies, usually only in one ear. For patients with mild or atypical hydrops, the hearing thresholds may be normal, but they may experience a subjective, unilateral distortion of sounds in lower frequencies, such as diplacusis or that voices are sounding "robotic". Patients may also mention a feeling of pressure or fullness in the ear.

It is also possible to reveal the presence of hydrops with an MRI.

If vertigo is experienced, the diagnosis progresses to Meniere's disease. This occurs if the fluid increase leads to a leak or rupture of the membranes in the inner ear, causing a mixture of perilymph and endolymph.

== Treatment ==
Treatment for cochlear hydrops is the same as for Meniere's disease. Currently, no cure exists for either.

If a patient has undergone sudden sensorineural hearing loss, a course of steroids is often prescribed in an attempt to recover the hearing. Steroids may be injected directly through the eardrum.

Like Meniere's Disease, a low salt diet is recommended as a preventative measure. A diuretic may be prescribed to help lower salt content.

Betahistine is the most widely prescribed medication for the treatment of Meniere's disease. The drug is thought to increase blood flow to the inner ear and to prevent the frequency and intensity of episodes. While Betahistine is considered safe, there is insufficient evidence that it is an effective treatment. It is not FDA approved in the United States, yet has still been clinically observed to benefit patients, and is considered safer and more effective than diuretics. Betahistine at high doses (such as 144 mg/day) can yield similar vertigo control as intratympanic dexamethasone.

Antivirals have been proven effective for those who suspect a viral cause for their cochlear Hydrops.

For some, surgery may be effective, such as an endolymphatic sac decompression. Surgery is often reserved for cases where other measures have proven ineffective and/or when vestibular issues are the main complaint, as it runs the risk of causing hearing or other nerve damage.

== Prognosis ==
The symptoms of cochlear hydrops fluctuate, and the condition may stabilize or go away on its own after several years. However, because the organ of Corti undergoes stress during the hydrops episodes, long-term hearing loss, tinnitus, or hyperacusis is possible.

It is considered by some that cochlear hydrops is an early form of Meniere's disease. However, while all people with Meniere's disease have some form of hydrops, the majority of cochlear hydrops patients do not go on to develop Meniere's disease. It takes an average of one year from the onset of symptoms for someone to develop full Meniere's disease, if at all.

== Relationship to Meniere's disease ==
The data on how often progression to Meniere's disease occurs is mixed, but the majority of recent studies suggest a low likelihood.

A 1984 study from Japan looked at patients with Meniere's disease and classified them into subcategories based on their first symptoms. The study found that the majority of patients with Meniere's disease (104 out of 163, or 63.80%) presented vertigo with their first symptoms, and only 59 out of 163 (36.19%) of patients presented with cochlear symptoms first, such as "tinnitus or deafness." However, the study found that 59 out of 74 (79.72%) patients who started out with a cochlear hydrops diagnosis progressed to Meniere's disease, and concluded that "cochlear Meniere's disease frequently develops into Meniere's disease."

Conversely, A 2006 study from doctors at the House Ear Institute found that “conversion from cochlear hydrops to Meniere's disease occurred in 33%” of diagnosed patients in a study including 46 subjects. A 2009 study from Japan found that only about 10% of their diagnosed patients with sudden low-frequency hearing loss (SLFHL) went on to develop full Meniere's disease, and about 18% with recurring SLFHL developed Meniere's disease. From this study, about 70% of patients who did not develop Meniere's disease maintained their hearing in the end. 30% went on to have lasting hearing difficulty, reported from a ten-year follow-up.

A 2018 study from Korea found the chance of progression to Meniere's disease of all participants with SLFHL to be 9.38% with an average progression time of 1.7±1.4 years, but when limited to patients with recurring symptoms "it was confirmed that about half (46.88%) of them progressed to Meniere's disease." However, the study was said to have limitations as "hearing fluctuations and the possibility of transitioning to Meniere's disease in the non-relapse group could not be completely ruled out."
