= Peter Silberman =

American singer

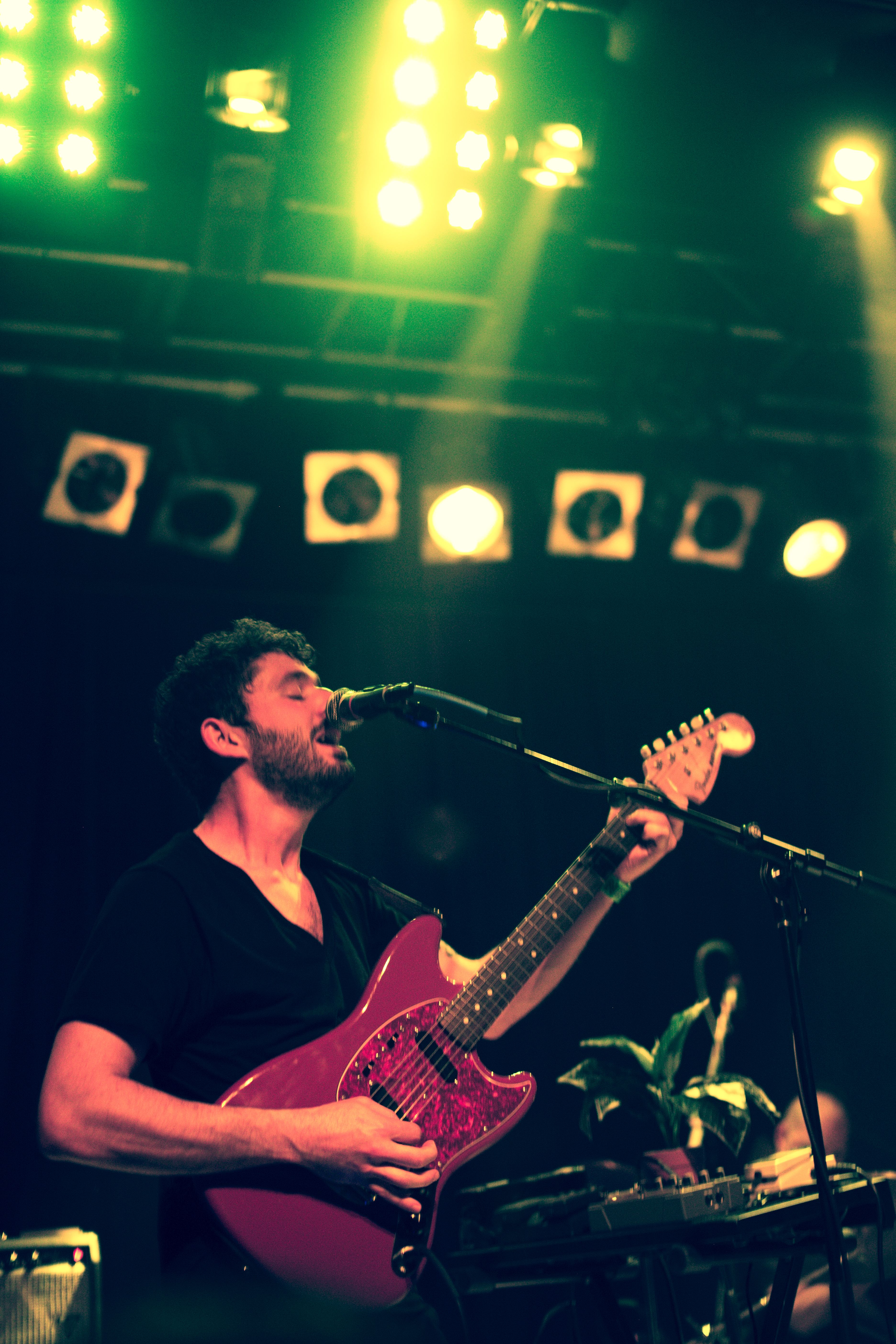
- Silberman performing with The Antlers at Neumos in Seattle, Washington on May 5, 2010

Background information
- Born: March 31, 1986 (age 40); United States
- Origin: New York City, United States
- Occupations: Songwriter, vocalist, instrumentalist
- Member of: The Antlers

Peter Silberman (born March 31, 1986) is an American songwriter, vocalist, and guitarist. He is best known as the frontman of the Brooklyn-based rock band The Antlers. In 2017 he released a solo album, Impermanence.

== Musical career ==
Silberman grew up in Katonah, New York and moved to New York City to attend New York University. It was around this time that Silberman started making and recording music under the name The Antlers, which began as a solo project. Silberman’s first album, Uprooted, contained nine songs which he wrote and recorded himself. It was self-released in 2006. Silberman has stated that when beginning the band as a solo project, his approach to home recording and production was largely inspired by the techniques of lo-fi musician Phil Elverum (The Microphones and Mount Eerie); in particular, that of the critically acclaimed 2001 release, The Glow Pt. 2.

The follow-up album In the Attic of the Universe was also written and recorded by Silberman. It was recorded by Silberman alone between September 2006 and March 2007, and released by Fall Records on November 6, 2007, being the first Antlers album to be released with the help of a record label. When commenting on the album, Silberman noted that the album was recorded at a low point in his life, when he was able to find comfort in his fascination with the universe. This fascination led to the album's recurring theme of the universe and its vastness. Silberman also noted that the album carries a theme of "religious misdirection", inspired by his own tendency to find the wrong solutions to his problems in life.

After the release of In the Attic of the Universe Silberman recorded two EPs entitled Cold War and New York Hospitals, the latter featuring Michael Lerner and Sharon Van Etten as guests. Shortly thereafter, Michael Lerner and Darby Cicci came on board transforming The Antlers into a collaborative group.

In February 2017, Siberman released the album Impermanence, which he recorded in up-state New York with Nicholas Principe. He revealed in an interview that he suffered from tinnitus and resorted to a sparse and acoustic style of performing.

== Discography ==
=== Albums ===
- Impermanence (2017)

=== Singles ===
- "Transcendless Summer" (2016)
- "Slips Away" (2016)
- "Karuna" (2016)
- "New York" (2017)
