= Hearing test =

Evaluation of the sensitivity of a person's sense of hearing

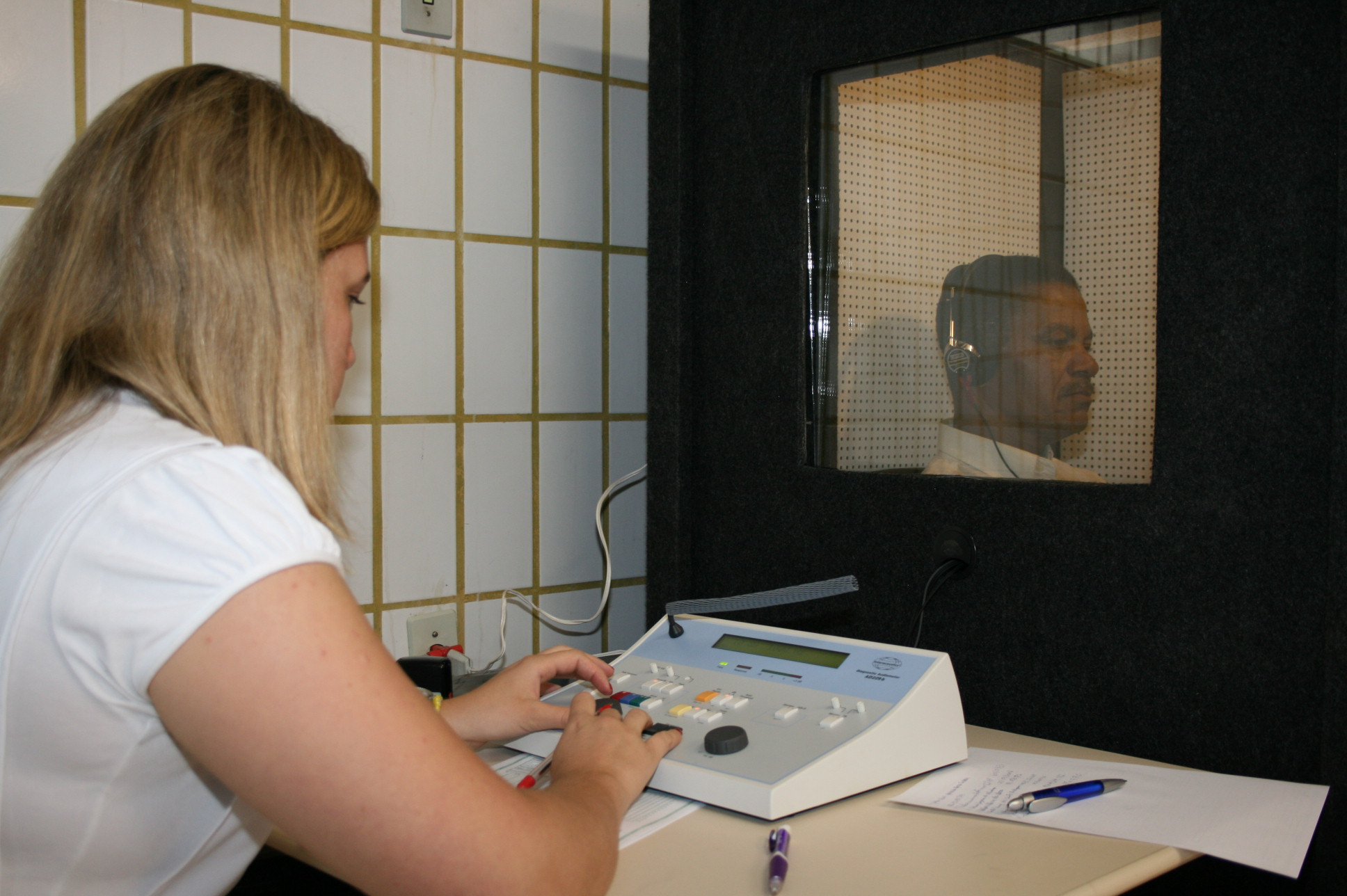
- A hearing health professional conducting an audiometric hearing test in a sound-treated testing booth
- ICD-10-PCS: F13Z
- ICD-9-CM: 95.41
- MeSH: D006320

A hearing test provides an evaluation of the sensitivity of a person's sense of hearing and is most often performed by an audiologist using an audiometer. An audiometer is used to determine a person's hearing sensitivity at different frequencies. There are other hearing tests as well, e.g., Weber test and Rinne test.

== Ear examination ==
Prior to the hearing test, the ears of the patient are usually examined with an otoscope to make sure they are free of wax, that the eardrum is intact, the ears are not infected, and the middle ear is free of fluid (indicating middle ear infection).

== Pure tone audiometry ==
The standard and most common type of hearing test is pure tone audiometry, which measures the air and bone conduction thresholds for each ear in a set of 8 standard frequencies from 250Hz to 8000Hz. The test is conducted in a sound booth using either a pair of foam inserts or supraural headphones connected to an external audiometer. The result of the test is an audiogram diagram which plots a person's hearing sensitivity at the tested frequencies. On an audiogram an "x" plot represents the softest threshold heard at each specific frequency in the left ear, and an "o" plot represents the softest threshold heard at each specific frequency in the right ear. There is also a high frequency version of the test which tests frequencies over 8000Hz to 16000Hz which may be employed in special circumstances.

== In-situ audiometry using mobile applications ==
The availability of stereo headphones and smartphones or tablets equipped with sound reproduction systems led to the appearance of new audiologic diagnostic methods which help people identify their degree of hearing loss without assistance. For users of these mobile devices, there are a number of applications available with a function for audiometric hearing testing. There are also hearing aid applications with a built-in hearing test for making hearing aid adjustments.

In the process of hearing test with specialized applications, initial hearing thresholds of perception of tone signals on different frequencies (audiogram) are identified.

Hearing thresholds, like with traditional audiometry, and with a special application, are determined on a standard set of frequencies from 125 Hz to 8 kHz. Also, an application can be integrated with a function for testing the relevance of perception of separate sounds and figures of intelligibility in various acoustic conditions.

Technically, the hearing test application consists of the following blocks:

- program module-generator of tone signals of the required frequency;
- graphic interface options (for fixing the user's reaction to exceeding tone perception threshold);
- interpreter of test results (text and graphics);
- database with the results of previous examinations and age-normalized hearing parameters

Hearing test results obtained through the application will be in error as compared to the results of hearing test conducted by an audiologist because of the following reasons:

- the use of specialized calibrated equipment;
- sound-proofing of the room where hearing test is held;
- heterogeneity of parameters of sound-recording systems in smartphones and tablets, and also headphones or headsets;
- noise masking effect of tone signals

Despite possible errors in the results of diagnostics, the undoubted advantages of hearing testing with a special application or hearing aid application include the ability to do the hearing test without assistance and the availability of hearing testing.

Scientists suggest that the hearing test using a mobile application can be used to identify hearing pathologies and also for hearing screening tests.

== Weber and Rinne ==
A complete hearing evaluation involves several other tests as well. In order to determine what kind of hearing loss is present, a bone conduction hearing test is administered. In this test, a vibrating tuning fork is placed behind the ear, on the mastoid process. When the patient can no longer feel/hear the vibration, the tuning fork is held in front of the ear; the patient should once more be able to hear a ringing sound. If they cannot, there is conductive hearing loss in that ear. Additionally, the tuning fork is placed on the forehead. The patient is then asked if the sound is localised in the centre of the head or whether it is louder in either ear. If there is conductive hearing loss, it is likely to be louder in the affected ear; if there is sensorineural hearing loss, it will be quieter in the affected ear. This test helps the audiologist determine whether the hearing loss is conductive (caused by problems in the outer or middle ear) or sensorineural (caused by problems in the cochlea, the sensory organ of hearing) or neural - caused by a problem in the auditory nerve or auditory pathways/cortex of the brain.

== Hearing in Noise ==
The Hearing in Noise Test (HINT) measures a person's ability to hear speech in quiet and in noise. In the test, the patient is required to repeat sentences both in a quiet environment and with competing noise being presented from different directions. More specifically, there are four conditions: (1) sentences with no competing noise, (2) sentences with competing noise presented directly in front of the patient, (3) noise presented at 90° to the right of the patient, and (4) noise presented at 90° to the left of the patient. The test measures signal-to-noise ratio for the different conditions which corresponds to how loud the sentences needed to be played above the noise so that the patient can repeat them correctly 50% of the time.

== Words-in-Noise Test ==
The Words-in-Noise Test (WIN) uses monosyllabic words presented at seven different signal-to-noise ratios with masking noise - typically speech spectrum noise. The WIN test will yield a score for a person's ability to understand speech in a noisy background. Unlike a pure-tone audiogram, the WIN test may provide a more functional test of a person's hearing in a situation that is likely to occur.

== Modified Rhyme Test ==
The Modified Rhyme Test (MRT) is defined in the American National Standard ANSI S3.2 Methods for Measuring the Intelligibility of Speech Over Communication Systems. The method consists of 50 sets of six monosyllabic words that differ in initial or final consonant (e.g. not, tot, got, pot, hot, lot or ray, raze, rate, rave, rake, race). The listener is typically presented with one of the words in the sextet preceded by a phrase, "You will mark the word ___". The six words that rhyme are presented to the listener to select what they believe to be the correct answer. The MRT has been extensively used by the US Air Force to test the performance of different communication systems, which often include a noise interference component. If a condition achieves a score of 80% correct responses or better, then that is often an acceptable performance level.

== Stenger test ==
A Stenger test is a test of hearing, primarily used to confirm non-organic hearing loss (individuals who falsely claim to have hearing loss) in one ear.

== Other ==
- The audiologist or hearing instrument specialist may also conduct speech tests, wherein the patient repeats the words he or she hears.
- In addition, a test called a tympanogram is generally done. In this test, a small probe is placed in the ear and the air pressure in the ear canal is varied. This test tells the audiologist how well the eardrum and other structures in the middle ear are working. The ear canal volume indicates whether a perforation in the eardrum (tympanic membrane) may be present. The middle ear pressure indicates whether any fluid is present in the middle ear space (also called "glue ear" or "otitis media with effusion"). Compliance measurement indicates how well the eardrum and ossicles (the three ear bones) are moving.
- The last test the audiologist may perform is an acoustic reflex test. In this test a probe is placed in the ear and a loud tone, greater than 70 dBSPL, is produced. The test measures the reflexive contraction of the stapedius muscle, which is important in protecting the ear from loud noises, such as a person's own speech which may be 90 dBSPL at the eardrum. This test can be used to give information about the vestibular and facial nerves and indicate if a lesion may be present.
