= Heinrich Adolf Rinne =

German physician (1819–1868)

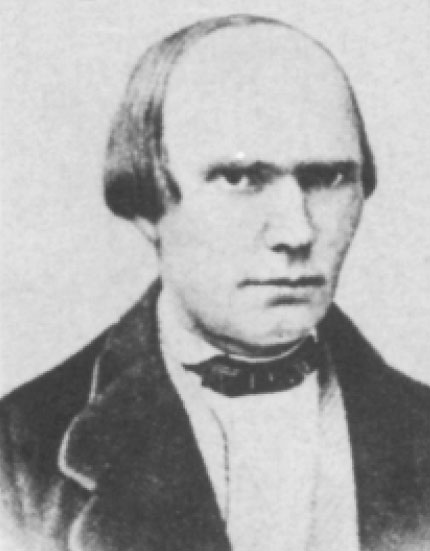
Heinrich Adolf Rinne (1819-1868)

Heinrich Adolf Rinne (January 24, 1819 – July 26, 1868) was a German otologist born in Vlotho an der Weser.

He received his doctorate from the University of Göttingen and practiced medicine in the city of Göttingen. Later he was a physician in Sandstadt near Stade (1857) and Hildesheim (1860).

In 1855 Rinne described the combined conductive process of the tympanic membrane and the ossicles of the middle ear. He is known for the eponymous Rinne test. The Rinne test is a hearing test conducted with a tuning fork, and is used to test and compare a patients' hearing via air conduction (normal process) or by way of bone conduction (sound to the inner ear through the mastoid). He reasoned that if a person hears a sound for a longer period of time through bone conduction than through air conduction, a disease is present somewhere in the conduction apparatus.

Despite his research, "Rinne's test" wasn't generally recognized until after his death — in the early 1880s, otologists Friedrich Bezold (1842-1908) and August Lucae (1835–1911) further publicized Rinne's work.

== Selected writings ==
- Über das Stimmorgan und die Bildung der Sprache. Müller’s Archiv für Anatomie, Physiologie und wissenschaftliche Medicin, Berlin, 1850.
- Beiträge zur Physiologie des menschlichen Ohres. Zeitschrift für rationelle Medicin, Leipzig and Heidelberg, 1864.
- Über die Formen des Himmelgewölbes. Zeitschrift für rationelle Medicin, Leipzig and Heidelberg, 1866.
- Materialismus und ethisches Bedürfnis in ihrem Verhältnisse zur Psychologie. Braunschweig, 1868.

== See also ==
- Weber test, named after Ernst Heinrich Weber (1795–1878).
