= Tympanometry =

Acoustic evaluation of the condition of the middle ear

- ICD-9-CM: 95.41
- MeSH: D000158
- MedlinePlus: 003390

Tympanometry is an acoustic evaluation of the condition of the middle ear eardrum (tympanic membrane) and the conduction bones by creating variations of air pressure in the ear canal.

Tympanometry is an objective test of middle-ear function. It is not a hearing test, but rather a measure of energy transmission through the middle ear. It is not a measure of eardrum or middle ear mobility. It is an acoustic measure, measured by a microphone, as part of the ear canal probe, inserted into the ear canal. The test should not be used to assess the sensitivity of hearing and the results of this test should always be viewed in conjunction with pure tone audiometry.

Tympanometry is a valuable component of the audiometric evaluation. In evaluating hearing loss, tympanometry permits a distinction between sensorineural and conductive hearing loss, when evaluation is not apparent via Weber and Rinne testing. Furthermore, in a primary care setting, tympanometry can be helpful in making the diagnosis of otitis media by demonstrating the presence of fluid build up in the middle ear cavity.

== Operation ==
A tone of 226 Hz is generated by a probe tip inserted into the external ear canal, where the sound strikes the tympanic membrane, causing vibration of the middle ear.

While 226 Hz is the most common probe tone, others can be used. In infants under 4 months of age, research has shown a 1000 Hz tone yields more accurate results. Multi-frequency tympanometry is conducted at multiple frequencies between 250 and 2000 Hz and is used to help identify ossicular abnormalities.

Admittance is how energy is transmitted through the middle ear. The instrument measures the reflected sound and expresses it as an admittance or compliance, plotting the results on a chart known as a tympanogram.

Normally, the air pressure in the ear canal is the same as ambient pressure. Also, under normal conditions, the air pressure in the middle ear is approximately the same as ambient pressure since the eustachian tube opens periodically to ventilate the middle ear and equalize pressure. In a healthy individual, the maximum sound is transmitted through the middle ear when the ambient air pressure in the ear canal is equal to the pressure in the middle ear.

== Procedure ==
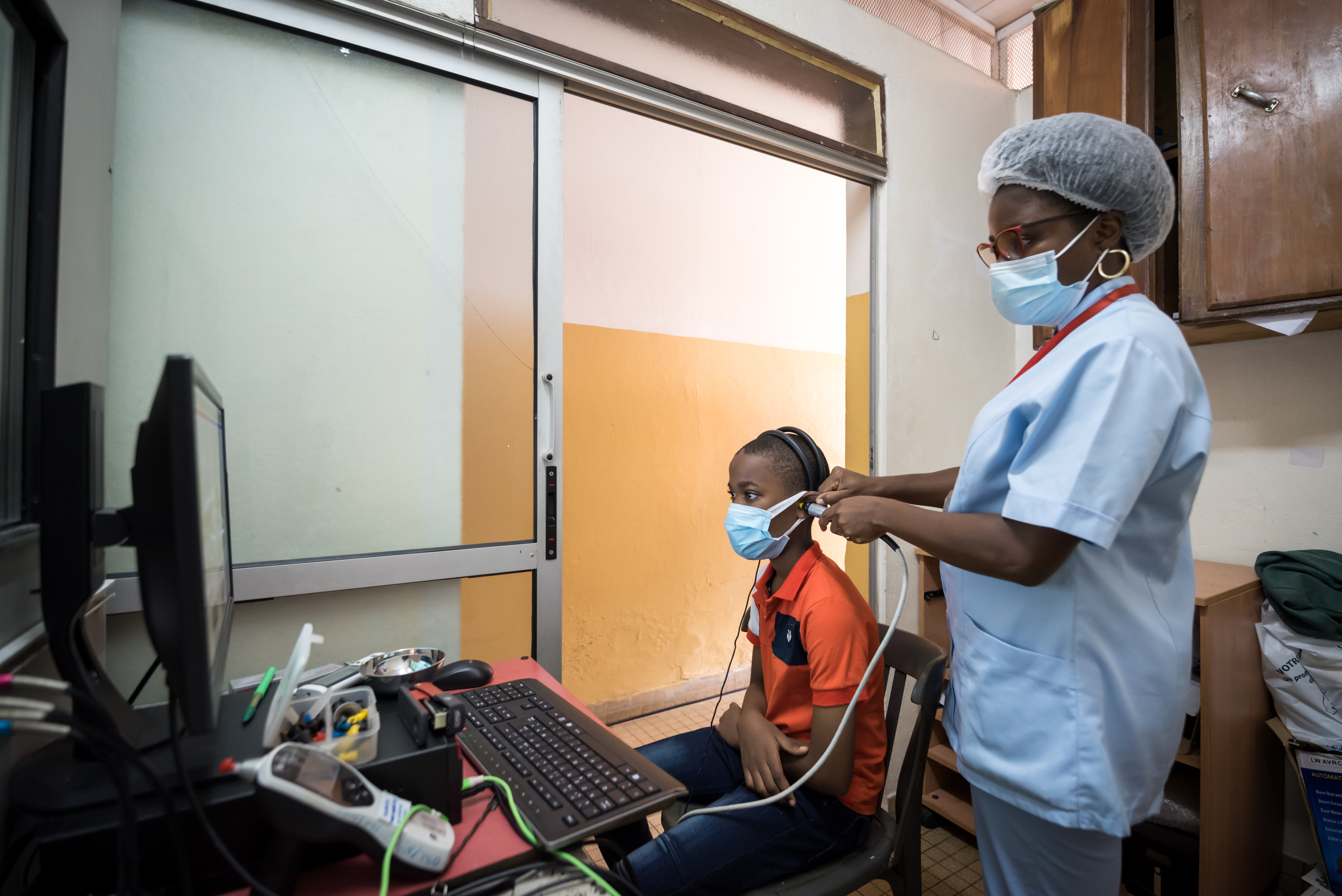
Tympanometry in a boy in Cameroon.

After otoscopy (examination of the ear with an otoscope) to ensure that the path to the eardrum is clear and there is no perforation, the test is performed by inserting the tympanometer probe in the ear canal. The instrument changes the pressure in the ear, generates a pure tone, and measures the eardrum responses to the sound at different pressures. This produces a series of data measuring how admittance varies with pressure, which is plotted as a tympanogram:

Types of tympanograms
Type A

Type B

Type C

Tympanograms are categorized according to the shape of the plot. A normal tympanogram (left) is labelled Type A. There is a normal pressure in the middle ear with normal mobility of the eardrum and ossicles. Type B tympanogram may reveal (a) fluid in the middle ear, (b) perforation of the tympanic membrane or patent pressure equalization tube, or (c) a tumor in the middle ear. Type C tympanograms are consistent with negative pressure in the middle ear space resulting from compromised eustachian tube function and a retracted tympanic membrane.

The categorising of tympanometric data should not be used as a diagnostic indicator. It is merely a description of shape. There is a distinction between the three types as well as the two subtypes of type A, namely A_{S} and A_{D}. For example, A_{S} (a shallow tympanogram) will show a stiff middle ear system or A_{D} (a deep tympanogram) consistent with ossicular discontinuity or a monomeric membrane. Only measures of static acoustic admittance, ear canal volume, and tympanometric width/gradient compared to sex, age, and race specific normative data can be used to somewhat accurately diagnose middle ear pathology along with the use of other audiometric data (e.g. air and bone conduction thresholds, otoscopic examination, normal word recognition at elevated presentation levels, etc.).

== Tympanometry by end users ==
=== Smartphones ===
There have been a few efforts to lower the cost of tympanometers by using smartphones. In 2022, University of Washington researchers had demonstrated an end-to-end smartphone-based tympanometer system that consists of a portable phone attachment used to change the air pressure in the ear. The smartphone computes and displays a tympanogram and reports peak acoustic admittance in real-time. The smartphone-based system operated at 226 Hz and in proof-of-concept testing showed comparable results to commercial tympanometers. Given the ubiquity of smartphones across the world, these mobile systems may help make these audiology tools accessible across the world.

=== Consumer devices ===
Consumer devices have been made to allow checking for middle-ear fluid at home. A 2009 study found the Ear Check Middle Ear Monitor consumer model acoustic reflectometer to give few false negative results in detecting middle-ear fluid; specificity and positive predictive values were modest, with many false positives. The device was no longer available in 2023.
