= Conductive hearing loss =

- Anatomy of the human ear.
- Specialty: ENT surgery

Conductive hearing loss (CHL) is a type of hearing impairment that occurs when sound waves are unable to efficiently travel through the outer ear, tympanic membrane (eardrum), or middle ear structures such as the ossicles. This blockage or dysfunction prevents sound from being effectively conducted to the inner ear, resulting in reduced hearing ability. CHL can either impact one ear, called unilateral conductive hearing loss, or both ears, called bilateral conductive hearing loss. Common causes include ear infections, fluid in the middle ear, earwax buildup, damage to the eardrum, or abnormalities in the ossicles.

CHL can occur alone or alongside sensorineural hearing loss, in which case it is classified as mixed hearing loss. Diagnosis and testing of CHL can include ear exams, hearing tests, tympanometry tests, and/or imaging, such as a computed tomography (CT) scan or magnetic resonance imaging (MRI). Depending on the underlying cause, CHL is often treatable and sometimes reversible through medical interventions, such as medication, surgery, or assistive devices like hearing aids. However, chronic or permanent cases may require long-term management to improve hearing and communication abilities.

== Signs and symptoms ==
CHL makes all sounds seem faint or muffled. The hearing loss is usually worse in lower frequencies. Congenital conductive hearing loss is identified through newborn hearing screening or may be identified because the baby has microtia or other facial abnormalities. CHL developing during childhood is usually due to otitis media with effusion and may present with speech and language delay or difficulty hearing, which can appear as inattentiveness or lack of response and difficulties learning or playing. Other symptoms of childhood CHL could include ear pain, snoring, mouth breathing, and ear and nasal discharge. A later onset of CHL may have an obvious cause, such as an ear infection, trauma, or upper respiratory tract infection, or may have an insidious onset related to chronic middle ear disease, otosclerosis, or a tumour of the nasopharynx. Earwax is a very common cause of CHL, which may present suddenly when the wax blocks sound from getting through the external ear canal to the middle and inner ear.

== Causes ==
Common causes of CHL include:

=== External ear ===
- Cerumen (earwax) or foreign body in the external auditory canal
- Otitis externa, infection or irritation of the outer ear
- Exostoses, abnormal growth of bone within the ear canal
- Tumor of the ear canal
- Congenital stenosis or atresia of the external auditory canal (narrow or blocked ear canal).
  - Ear canal stenosis & atresia can exist independently or may result from congenital malformations of the auricle such as microtia or anotia.
- Acquired stenosis (narrowing) of the external auditory canal following surgery or radiotherapy

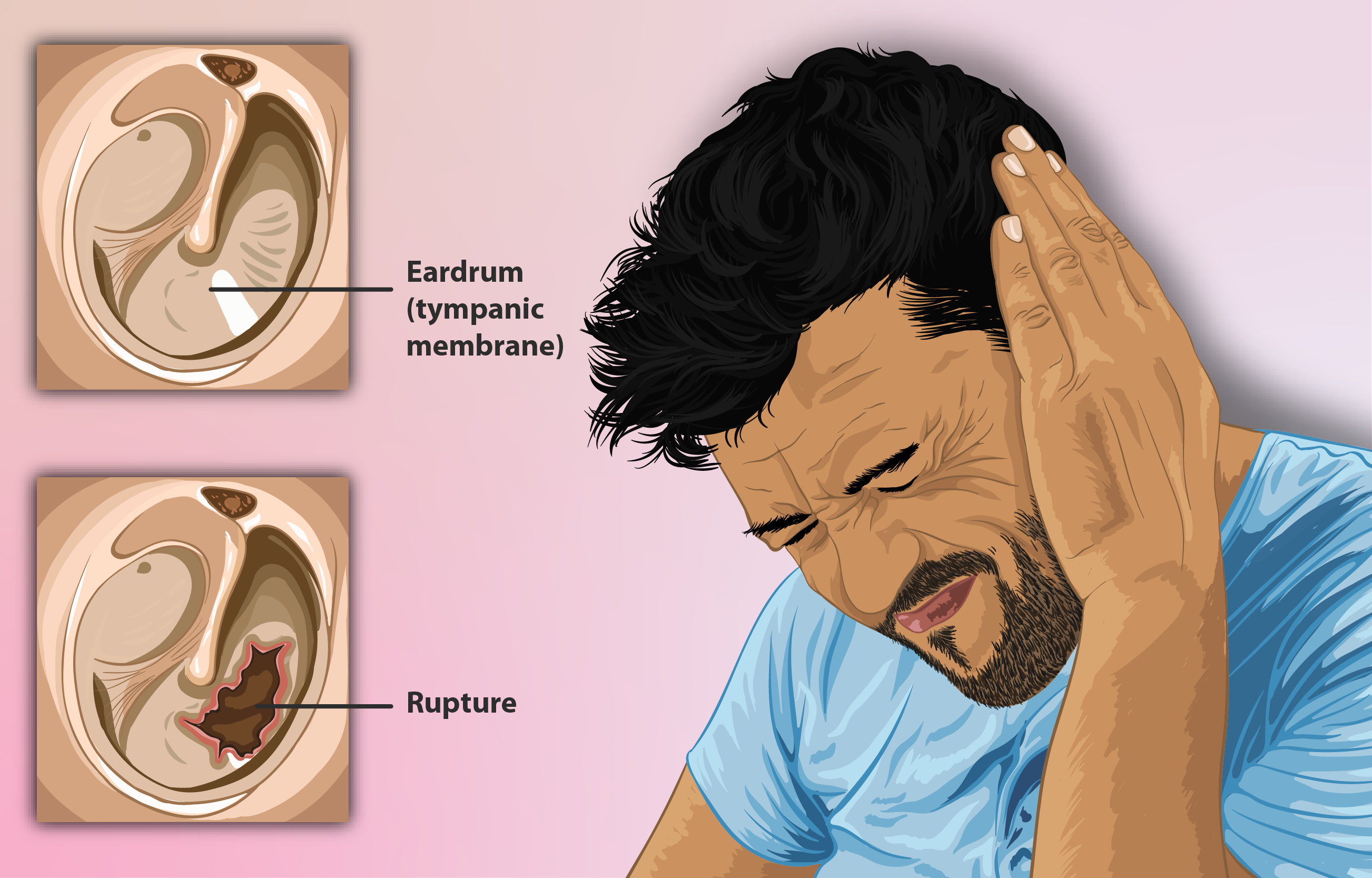
An illustration of a typical eardrum compared to a perforated eardrum.

=== Middle ear ===
Fluid accumulation is the most common cause of CHL in the middle ear, especially in children. Major causes are ear infections or conditions that block the eustachian tube, such as allergies or tumors. Blocking of the eustachian tube leads to decreased pressure in the middle ear relative to the external ear, and this causes decreased motion of both the ossicles and the tympanic membrane.

- Acute or serous otitis media
- Chronic suppurative otitis media
- Perforated eardrum
- Tympanosclerosis or scarring of the eardrum
- Cholesteatoma
- Eustachian tube dysfunction, inflammation or mass within the nasal cavity, middle ear, or eustachian tube itself
- Otosclerosis, abnormal growth of bone in or near the middle ear
- Middle ear tumour
- Ossicular discontinuity as a consequence of infection or temporal bone trauma
- Congenital malformation of the ossicles. This can be an isolated phenomenon or may occur as part of a syndrome where development of the 1st and 2nd branchial arches is seen, such as in Goldenhar syndrome, Treacher Collins syndrome, branchio-oto-renal syndrome, etc.
- Barotrauma, unequal air pressures in the external and middle ear. This can temporarily occur, for example, by the environmental pressure changes as when shifting altitude, or inside a train going into a tunnel. It is managed by any of various methods of ear clearing manoeuvres to equalize the pressures, like swallowing, yawning, or the Valsalva manoeuvre. More severe barotrauma can lead to middle ear fluid or even permanent sensorineural hearing loss.

=== Inner ear ===
The third window effect is caused by:

- Superior canal dehiscence – which may require surgical correction
- Enlarged vestibular aqueduct
- Labyrinthine fistula

== Diagnosis ==
Diagnosis requires a detailed history, local examination of the ear, nose, throat, and neck, and detailed hearing tests. In children, a more detailed examination may be required if the hearing loss is congenital.

=== Otoscopy ===
Examination of the external ear canal and eardrum is important and helps identify problems located in the outer ear up to the tympanic membrane.

=== Differential testing ===
For basic screening, CHL can be identified using the Rinne test with a 256 Hz tuning fork. The Rinne test, in which a patient is asked to say whether a vibrating tuning fork is heard more loudly adjacent to the ear canal (air conduction) or touching the bone behind the ear (bone conduction), is negative, indicating that bone conduction is more effective than air conduction. A normal, or positive, result is when air conduction is more effective than bone conduction.

With a one-sided conductive component, the combined use of both the Weber and Rinne tests is useful. If the Weber test is used, in which a vibrating tuning fork is touched to the midline of the forehead, the person will hear the sound more loudly in the affected ear because background noise does not mask the hearing on this side.

The following table compares sensorineural hearing loss to conductive:

Criterion	Sensorineural hearing loss	Conductive hearing loss
Anatomical site	Inner ear, cranial nerve VIII, or central processing centers	Middle ear (ossicular chain), tympanic membrane, or external ear
Weber test	Sound localizes to the normal ear	Sound localizes to the affected ear (ear with conductive loss)
Rinne test	Positive Rinne; air conduction - bone conduction (both air and bone conduction are decreased equally, but the difference between them is unchanged).	Negative Rinne; bone conduction - air conduction (bone/air gap)

=== Tympanometry ===
Tympanometry, or acoustic impedance testing, is a simple objective test of the ability of the middle ear to transmit sound waves from the outer ear to the middle ear and to the inner ear. This test is usually abnormal with conductive hearing loss. A type B tympanogram reveals a flat response, due to fluid in the middle ear (otitis media) or an eardrum perforation. A type C tympanogram indicates negative middle ear pressure, which is commonly seen in eustachian tube dysfunction. A type A tympanogram indicates a shallow compliance of the middle ear, which is commonly seen in otosclerosis.

=== Audiometry ===
Pure tone audiometry, a standardized hearing test over a set of frequencies from 250 Hz to 8000 Hz, may be conducted by a medical doctor, audiologist or audiometrist, with the result plotted separately for each ear on an audiogram. The shape of the plot reveals the degree and nature of hearing loss, distinguishing conductive hearing loss from other forms. A conductive hearing loss is characterized by a difference of at least 15 decibels between the air conduction threshold and bone conduction threshold at the same frequency. On an audiogram, the "x" represents responses in the left ear at each frequency, while the "o" represents responses in the right ear at each frequency.

=== CT scan ===
Most causes of CHL can be identified by physical examination, but if it is important to image the bones of the middle ear or inner ear, then a CT scan is required. A CT scan is useful in cases of congenital conductive hearing loss, chronic suppurative otitis media or cholesteatoma, ossicular damage or discontinuity, otosclerosis, and third window dehiscence. Specific MRI scans can be used to identify cholesteatoma.

== Management ==
Management falls into three modalities: surgical treatment, pharmaceutical treatment, and supportive, depending on the nature and location of the specific cause.

In cases of infection, antibiotics or antifungal medications are an option. Some conditions are amenable to surgical intervention, such as middle ear fluid, cholesteatoma, and otosclerosis. If conductive hearing loss is due to head trauma, surgical repair is an option. In either of these cases, some examples of surgical interventions could include an ossiculoplasty, which reconstructs or replaces the bones in the middle ear, or a stapedectomy, which replaces a small bone in the middle ear called the stape. If absence or deformation of ear structures cannot be corrected, or if the patient declines surgery, hearing aids which amplify sounds are a possible treatment option. Bone conduction hearing aids are useful as they deliver sound directly, through bone, to the cochlea or organ of hearing, bypassing the pathology. These can be on a soft or hard headbands or can include surgical implantation. Some modern implants connect to the mastoid and transmit sound electromagnetically, while others use a combination of adhesives and snap-on attachments to the mastoid, where the adhesive is responsible for conducting the sound. Conventional air conduction hearing aids can also be used.

== See also ==
- Hearing loss
- Sensorineural hearing loss
