= Tympanosclerosis =

Tympanoesclerosis
- Other names: Myringosclerosis, intratympanic tympanosclerosis
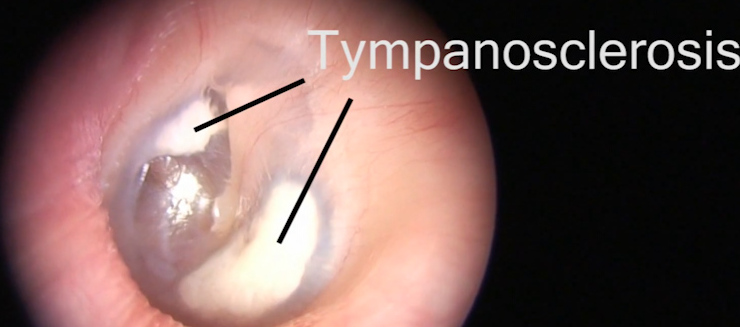
- Specialty: ENT surgery

Tympanosclerosis is a condition caused by hyalinization and subsequent calcification of subepithelial connective tissue of the tympanic membrane and middle ear, sometimes resulting in a detrimental effect to hearing.

== Signs and symptoms ==
Myringosclerosis rarely causes any symptoms. Tympanosclerosis, on the other hand, can cause significant hearing loss or chalky, white patches on the middle ear or tympanic membrane.

== Causes ==
The aetiology for tympanosclerosis is not extensively understood. There are several probable factors which could result in the condition appearing, including:

- Long term otitis media (or 'glue ear')
- Insertion of a tympanostomy tube. If aspiration is performed as part of the insertion, the risk of tympanosclerosis occurring increases. Risk also increases if a larger tube is used, or if the procedure is repeated.
- Atherosclerosis
- There is ongoing research as to whether or not cholesteatoma is associated with tympanosclerosis. If there is an association, it is likely that the two conditions co-exist.

== Pathophysiology ==
Increased fibroblast activity results in deposition of collagen. Calcium phosphate plaques then form in the lamina propria of the tympanic membrane.

== Diagnosis ==
If lesions are typical, non-extensive and with no detriment to hearing, investigation into the condition is rarely required. Audiometry is used to determine the extent of hearing loss, if any. Tympanometry produces tympanograms which can be different when tympanosclerosis is present. Computerised tomography (CT) can be used to determine if disease is present in the middle ear. Whilst hearing loss is a common symptom in many diseases of the ear, for example in otosclerosis (abnormal bone growth in the ear), the white, chalky patches on the tympanic membrane are fairly characteristic of tympanosclerosis. Cholesteatoma is similar in appearance but the whiteness is behind the tympanic membrane, rather than inside.

=== Classification ===
Myringosclerosis refers to a calcification only within the tympanic membrane and is usually less extensive than intratympanic tympanosclerosis, which refers to any other location within the middle ear such as the ossicular chain, middle ear mucosa or, less frequently, the mastoid cavity.

== Treatment ==
Hearing aids are a common treatment for hearing loss disorders. A more specific treatment is surgical, involving excision of the sclerotic areas and then further repair of the ossicular chain. There are several techniques, sometimes involving two surgeries; success rates are, however, variable. Damage to the inner ear as a result of surgical procedures is a possible and serious concern, as it can result in forms of sensorineural deafness.

== Prognosis ==
In most cases, tympanosclerosis does not cause any recognisable hearing loss up to ten years after the initial disease onset. Sclerotic changes seem to stabilise, but not resolve or dissolve, after 3 years.

== Epidemiology ==
Myringosclerosis seems to be more common than tympanosclerosis. Most research has not been conducted upon the general, healthy population, but rather those with otitis media or patients who have had tympanostomy tubes in prior procedures. Of the children studied who had 'glue ear', and who were treated with tympanostomy tubing, 23-40% of cases had tympanosclerosis. One study suggested that people with atherosclerosis were more likely to have tympanosclerosis than otherwise healthy individuals.
