= Pitch pipe =

Device for tuning musical instruments

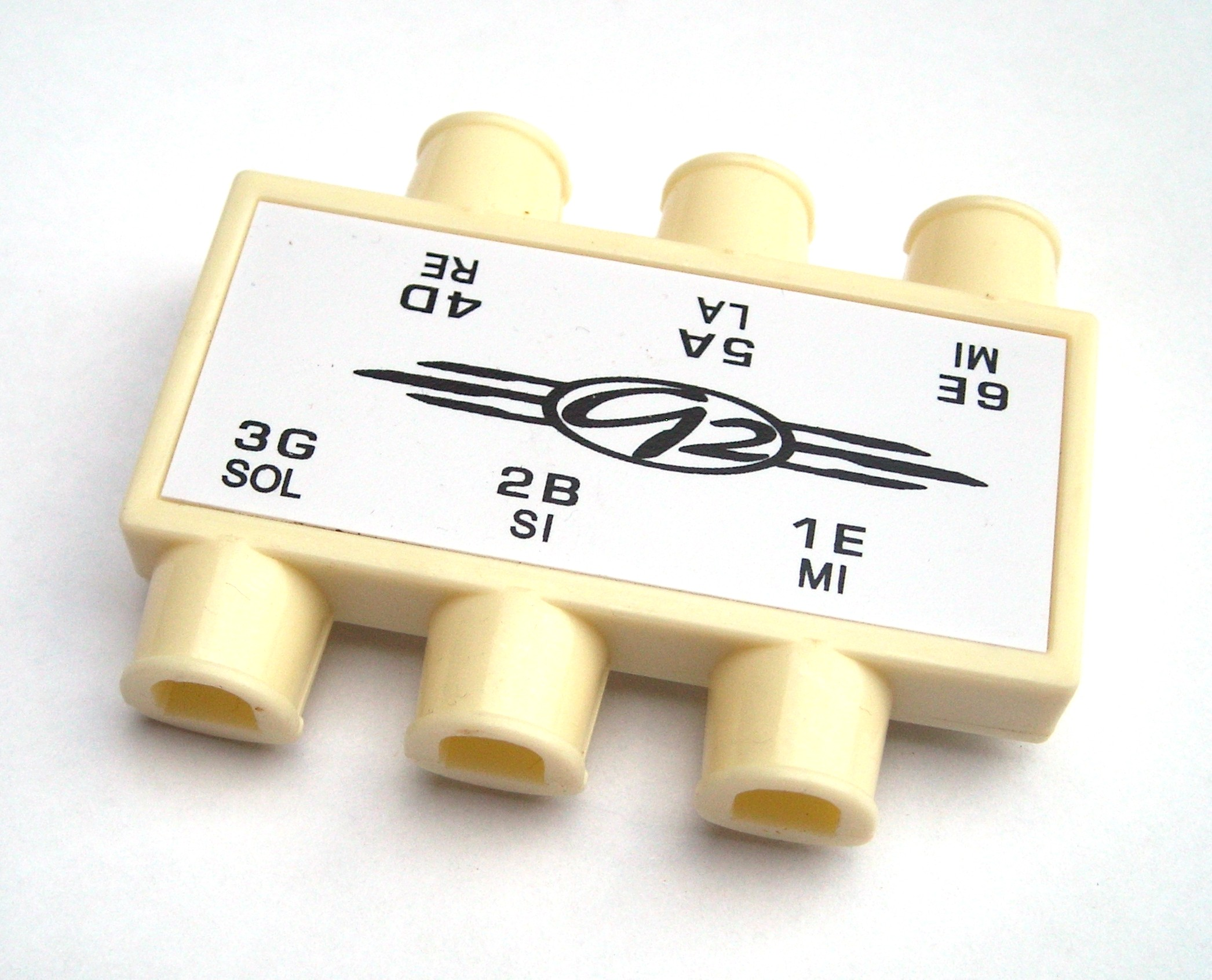
Modern set of pitch pipes for guitar tuning

A pitch pipe is a small device (a type of tuning harmonica) used to provide a pitch reference for musicians. Although it may be described as a musical instrument, it is not typically used to play music as such.

== Origins ==
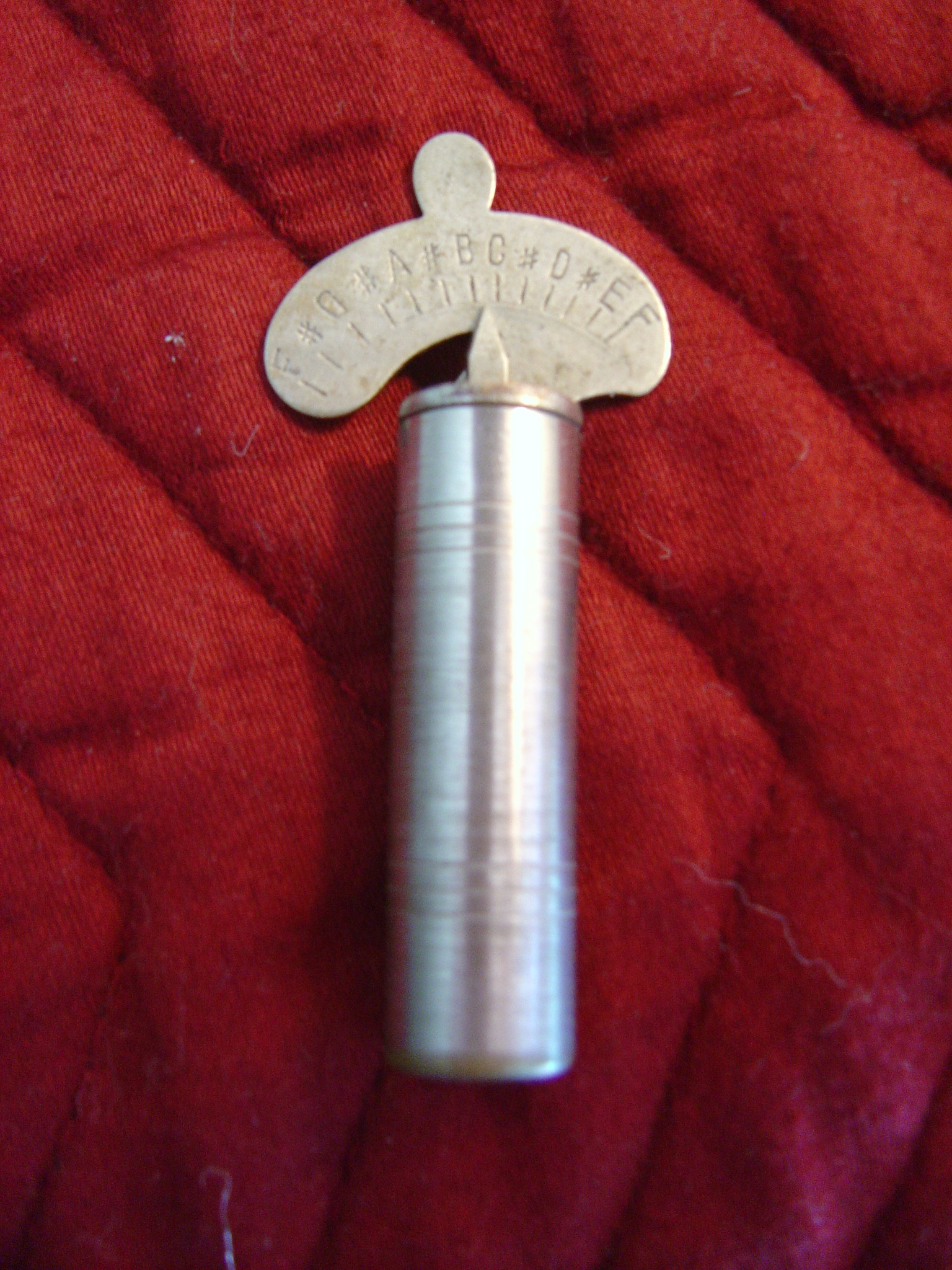
Variable pitch pipe

The earliest pitch pipes were instruments similar to the recorder, but rather than finger holes, they had a plunger like a slide whistle's (also known as a swanee whistle) making it essentially a type of slide whistle. The pipe was generally made of wood with a square bore, and the plunger was leather-coated. On this plunger are marked the notes of either the chromatic scale or the diatonic scale, and by setting it to the correct position, the indicated note will be produced when the instrument is blown. Pitch pipes come in all sorts of shapes and sizes.

Pitch pipes of this sort were most often used in the 18th and 19th centuries in churches which had no organ to give the opening note of a hymn. They are now quite rare, and hardly ever used for what they were intended for, but may still be used as an alternative to a tuning fork. They are also useful for establishing which pitch standard was being used at a particular place and time.

== Modern pitch pipes ==
Although few look like a pipe, the pitch pipe name is still applied to any device used as a pitch reference. The most common type is a circular free reed aerophone. These are discs with the holes for the reeds around the perimeter and with marked openings for each note, into which the user blows. Inside the pipe, the air flows through a hole in a plate past the selected rectangular metal reed (usually brass). The airflow is modulated by the oscillating reed, then it resonates in an outer sounding chamber. In recent years, electronic push-button devices simulating chromatic pitch pipes have become available which are small enough to fit on key chains.

== Usage ==
Some pitch pipes are intended for tuning string instruments, and only provide reeds for notes appropriate to a particular instrument. Chromatic pitch pipes are favored by a cappella singers and timpanists. Chromatic pipes most often provide thirteen pitches, each a half step above the previous. By providing all of the notes of a single octave, a singer can start in any key called for in Western music. Different pipes are available for bass and treble voices due to variations in vocal range. Most male and female performers prefer to use F-F pipes and C-C pipes, respectively. However, it is particularly notable that the men's pipe in F is pitched higher than the women's C pipe. Pipes in other keys are available, but are much more rare.

The singers' normal use of the pipe is to play the initial key note or tonic of the piece to be sung. Less frequently the pipe will be used to play the first sung note of the song, especially where the song begins in unison or with a solo.

In ethnomusicology, recording a short beep with a pitch pipe in ethnographic recordings can be used in playback to determine the playback speed of the gramophone record or phonograph cylinder.

== Problems ==
The brass reeds in common pitch pipes are subject to work hardening with use, so they gradually change pitch. Because of this, replacement reed plates are sold. Carried in a pocket, a pipe will occasionally pick up small bits of lint which work their way into the narrow space around a reed. This usually requires disassembly of the pipe in order to clean the lint off the reed. To avoid this eventuality, many users will use a small holster to carry the pipe.

== See also ==
- Tuning fork
- Electronic tuner
