= John Shore (trumpeter) =

English musician

John Shore (c. 1662 – 1752) was an English trumpeter and lutenist. He invented the tuning fork in 1711. Shore came from a family of musicians including the singer Catherine Shore. He was Sergeant Trumpeter to the court. He is credited with demonstrating that the trumpet, which up till then had been a military instrument, could be used in an orchestral role. Shore had parts specifically written for him by both George Frideric Handel and Henry Purcell.
