= Stenger test =

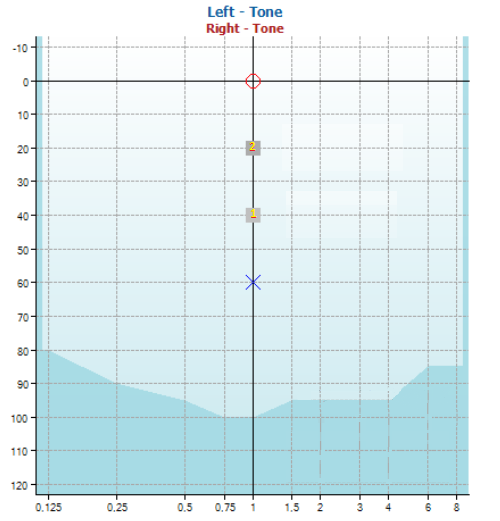
- Purpose: confirm non-organic hearing loss

A Stenger test is a test of hearing, primarily used to confirm non-organic hearing loss (individuals who falsely claim to have hearing loss) in one ear.

== Principle ==
The test is based on the Stenger principle. The principle states that, if a tone of two intensities (one greater than the other) is delivered to two ears of a person simultaneously, the ear which receives the tone of the higher intensity alone hears it.

== Method ==
The test can be done using tuning forks in the clinical setting. The individual is blindfolded before the test starts. Two tuning forks of the same frequency are stricken and kept at a distance of 25 cm from each ear. When asked, the individual will claim to hear it in the normal ear. Then, the tuning fork is brought as close as 8 cm near the feigned ear while maintaining the tuning fork at the normal side at the same distance. The individual will deny hearing anything if they are lying. An individual with true hearing loss should continue to hear the sound on the better hearing side. Alternatively, this test can be performed more accurately using a two-channel audiometer using pure tone signals. In this procedure, a tone is presented to the "good ear" at 10 to 20 dB SL (above the threshold level). Next, using the second channel, present the same tone to both ears simultaneously at 10 to 20 dB below the threshold for the "bad ear". Because the tone is being presented above the threshold in the better ear, a lack of response will mean that the tone has been heard loud enough in the "bad ear" that the patient can no longer detect the audible sound in the "good ear".

== Interpretation ==
A negative Stenger result indicates that the patient responded to the signal presented to the better ear, indicating an organic asymmetric hearing loss.

A positive Stenger result indicates that the patient did not respond even though the signal was 10 to 20 dB above the better ear, indicating a non-organic hearing loss.

The lowest HL of the tone in the poorer ear producing this effect is MCIL and should not be more than 20db above true threshold. Perk and Rose found that MCIL to be within 14db of the true threshold resulting in general conclusion that the Stenger test can identify the general hearing threshold of poorer ear in unilateral pseudohypoacusis cases.
