= August Lucae =

German otologist (1835–1911)

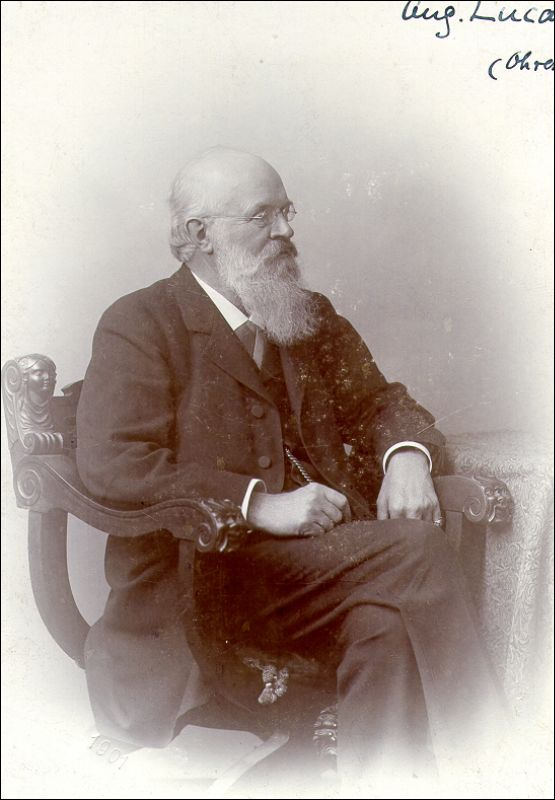
August Lucae (1835-1911)

Johann Constantin August Lucae (24 August 1835 – 17 March 1911) was a German otologist who was a native of Berlin.

He studied medicine in Berlin and Bonn, and in 1859 earned his doctorate. He furthered his studies in London with Joseph Toynbee (1815–1866), later returning to Berlin, where he worked in Virchow's pathological institute. In 1871 he became an associate professor, and in 1874 was appointed director of the university policlinic for ear diseases. In 1899 Lucae became a full professor of otology at the University of Berlin.

Lucae made numerous contributions in the field of otology, being remembered for his pioneer studies involving the transmission of sound via bone conduction for diagnosis of ear disease. He is credited with introducing an "interference otoscope", an apparatus he developed to determine the relative amount of reflection from both ears.

His name is associated with several instruments used in otology, including the "Lucae pressure probe", a device which uses vibratory massage for treatment of the middle ear in cases of progressive deafness.

== Selected publications ==
- Die Schallleitung durch die Kopfknochen und ihre Bedeutung für die Diagnostik der Ohrenkrankheiten (Bone conduction and its importance for diagnosis of ear diseases), Würzburg, 1870.
- Zur Entstehung und Behandlung der subjectiven Gehörsempfindungen (Emergence and treatment of subjective hearing sensations), Berlin, 1884.
