= Rinne test =

Screening test for hearing

- ICD-10-PCS: F13Z0ZZ
- ICD-9-CM: 95.42
- MeSH: D006320

The Rinne test (/ˈrɪnə/ RIN-ə) is used primarily to evaluate loss of hearing in one ear. It compares perception of sounds transmitted by air conduction to those transmitted by bone conduction through the mastoid. Thus, one can quickly screen for the presence of conductive hearing loss.

A Rinne test should always be accompanied by a Weber test to also detect sensorineural hearing loss and thus confirm the nature of hearing loss.

The Rinne test was named after German otologist Heinrich Adolf Rinne (1819–1868); the Weber test was named after Ernst Heinrich Weber (1795–1878).

== Procedure ==
Placement of the tuning fork in front of the ear, to test air conduction.

The Rinne test is performed by placing a 512 Hz vibrating tuning fork against the patient's mastoid bone and asking the patient to tell you when the sound is no longer heard. Once the patient signals they cannot hear it, the still vibrating tuning fork is then placed 1–2 cm from the auditory canal. The patient is then asked again to indicate when they are no longer able to hear the tuning fork.

== Results ==
=== Normal hearing ===
- Air conduction should be greater than bone conduction, so the patient should be able to hear the tuning fork next to the pinna (outer ear) after they can no longer hear it when held against the mastoid. This normal result is paradoxically called a positive Rinne test (as a positive medical test usually indicates an abnormality).

=== Abnormal hearing ===
- If the patient is not able to hear the tuning fork after it is moved from the mastoid to the pinna, it means that their bone conduction is greater than their air conduction. This indicates there is something inhibiting the passage of sound waves from the ear canal, through the middle ear apparatus and into the cochlea (i.e., there is a conductive hearing loss).
- In sensorineural hearing loss the ability to sense the tuning fork by both bone and air conduction is equally diminished, implying they will hear the tuning fork by air conduction after they can no longer hear it through bone conduction. This pattern is the same to what is found in people with normal hearing, but patients with sensorineural hearing loss will indicate that the sound has stopped much earlier. This can be revealed by the person administering the test (with normal hearing) placing the fork close to their own ear after the patient indicates that the sound has subsided, noting that the sound from the fork is still noticeable to a normal ear.
- In case of a severe sensorineural hearing loss caused due to a dead labyrinth, a false negative Rinne test may occur. It is caused by the fact that even though one ear is unable to respond to the test, the other ear can still be stimulated by the bone conduction test (via conducting sound through skull bones to the opposite ear), causing the patient to respond to the tuning fork on mastoid but not when it's placed near the affected ear's air canal.

== Air vs. bone conductive hearing loss ==
Air conduction uses the apparatus of the middle ear (pinna, eardrum and ossicles) to amplify and direct the sound to the cochlea, whereas bone conduction bypasses some or all of these and allows the sound to be transmitted directly to the inner ear albeit at a reduced volume, or via the bones of the skull to the opposite ear.

Description	Positive/negative
In an ear with normal hearing and an ear with sensorineural hearing loss, air conduction is more than bone conduction	Positive
In an ear with conductive hearing loss, bone conduction (BC) is better than air conduction	Negative

Note that the words positive and negative are used in a somewhat confusing fashion here, as compared to their typical use in medical tests. Positive or negative in this case means that a certain parameter that was evaluated was present or not. In this case, that parameter is whether air conduction is better than bone conduction. Thus, a "positive" result indicates the healthy state, in contrast to many other medical tests. Therefore, some prefer to avoid using the terms "positive" or "negative", and simply state if the test was normal or abnormal. For example: "Rinne's test was abnormal in the right ear, with bone conduction greater than air conduction".

			Weber test				
			lateralizes to left		no lateralization	lateralizes to right	
Condition of ears:			left	right	both	left	right
Rinne test	⊕	⊕	Normal	Sensorineural loss	Normal	Sensorineural loss	Normal
Rinne test	⊕	⊕	Normal	Sensorineural loss	Sensorineural loss	Sensorineural loss	Normal
Rinne test	⊖	⊕	Conductive loss	Normal		Combined loss	Normal
Rinne test	⊕	⊖	Normal	Combined loss		Normal	Conductive loss
Rinne test	⊖	⊖	Conductive loss	Combined loss	Conductive loss	Combined loss	Conductive loss
Rinne test	left ear	right ear	Combined loss = conductive and sensorineural loss				

== Limitations ==
This test and its complement, the Weber test, are quick screening tests and are not a replacement for formal audiometry. Recently, its value as a screening test has been questioned.

The Rinne test is not reliable in distinguishing sensorineural and conductive loss cases of severe unilateral or total sensorineural loss. In such cases, bone conduction to the contralateral normal ear will be better than air conduction, resulting in a false negative. In such a case, the Weber test will, however, show signs of lateralization, implying some kind of pathology. Formal audiometry testing would be required if any abnormal result is presented.

== See also ==
=== Internal links ===
- Weber test

=== External links ===
- Tuning Fork Tests - Family Practice Notebook. Retrieved February 3, 2007.
