= Sensorineural hearing loss =

Hearing loss caused by an inner ear or vestibulocochlear nerve defect

- Cross-section of the cochlea
- Specialty: Otorhinolaryngology

Sensorineural hearing loss (SNHL) is a type of hearing loss in which the root cause lies in the inner ear, sensory organ (cochlea and associated structures), or the vestibulocochlear nerve (cranial nerve VIII). SNHL accounts for about 90% of reported hearing loss. SNHL is usually permanent and can be mild, moderate, severe, profound, or total. However, if the loss happened suddenly, immediate treatment is needed, prednisone and other treatments may reverse the loss. Various other descriptors can be used depending on the shape of the audiogram, such as high frequency, low frequency, U-shaped, notched, peaked, or flat.

Sensory hearing loss often occurs as a consequence of damaged or deficient cochlear hair cells. Hair cells may be abnormal at birth or damaged during the lifetime of an individual. There are both external causes of damage, including infection, and ototoxic drugs, as well as intrinsic causes, including genetic mutations. A common cause or exacerbating factor in SNHL is prolonged exposure to environmental noise, or noise-induced hearing loss. Exposure to a single very loud noise, such as a gunshot or bomb blast, can cause noise-induced hearing loss. Using headphones at high volume over time, or being in loud environments regularly, such as a loud workplace, sporting events, concerts, and using noisy machines, can also be a risk for noise-induced hearing loss.

Neural, or "retrocochlear", hearing loss occurs because of damage to the cochlear nerve (CVIII). This damage may affect the initiation of the nerve impulse in the cochlear nerve or the transmission of the nerve impulse along the nerve into the brainstem.

Most cases of SNHL present with a gradual deterioration of hearing thresholds occurring over years to decades. In some, the loss may eventually affect large portions of the frequency range. It may be accompanied by other symptoms such as ringing in the ears (tinnitus) and dizziness or lightheadedness (vertigo). The most common kind of sensorineural hearing loss is age-related (presbycusis), followed by noise-induced hearing loss (NIHL).

Frequent symptoms of SNHL are loss of acuity in distinguishing foreground voices against noisy backgrounds, difficulty understanding on the telephone, some kinds of sounds seeming excessively loud or shrill, difficulty understanding some parts of speech (fricatives and sibilants), loss of directionality of sound (especially with high frequency sounds), perception that people mumble when speaking, and difficulty understanding speech. Similar symptoms are also associated with other kinds of hearing loss; audiometry or other diagnostic tests are necessary to distinguish sensorineural hearing loss.

Identification of sensorineural hearing loss is usually made by performing a pure tone audiometry (an audiogram) in which bone conduction thresholds are measured. Tympanometry and speech audiometry may be helpful. Testing is performed by an audiologist.

There is no proven or recommended treatment or cure for SNHL; management of hearing loss includes hearing strategies and hearing aids. In cases of profound or total deafness, a cochlear implant is a specialised device that may be a useful tool in aiding access to sound, ranging from mild to a functional level of hearing when the device is worn and working well. SNHL is at least partially preventable by avoiding environmental noise, ototoxic chemicals and drugs, and head trauma, and treating or inoculating against certain triggering diseases and conditions like meningitis.

Unlike other types of hearing loss, sudden sensorineural hearing loss (SSHL or SSNHL) is often treatable if addressed immediately. Many people notice that they have SSHL when they wake up in the morning. Others first notice it when they try to use the deafened ear, such as when they use a phone. Still others notice a loud, alarming "pop" just before their hearing disappears. People with sudden deafness often feel dizzy, have ringing in their ears (tinnitus), or both. Immediate treatment from an otolaryngologist (sometimes called an ENT surgeon) is needed. The primary treatment for SSHL is oral prednisone, and two recent formal studies both found that nearly half the patients fully recovered their hearing.

== Signs and symptoms ==
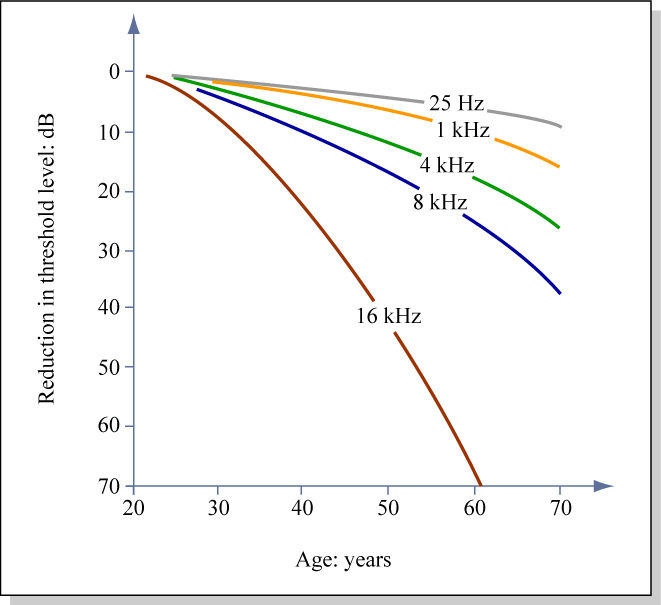
Reduction in human hearing threshold level with age

Since the inner ear is not directly accessible to instruments, identification is by patient report of the symptoms and audiometric testing. Of those who present to their doctor with sensorineural hearing loss, 90% report having diminished hearing, 57% report having a plugged feeling in the ear, and 49% report having ringing in the ear (tinnitus). About half report vestibular (vertigo) problems.

For a detailed exposition of symptoms useful for screening, the American Academy of Otolaryngology developed a self-assessment questionnaire called the Hearing Handicap Inventory for Adults (HHIA). It is a 25-question survey of subjective symptoms.

== Causes ==
Sensorineural hearing loss may be genetic or acquired (i.e., as a consequence of disease, noise, trauma, etc.). People may have a hearing loss from birth (congenital), or the hearing loss may develop later. Many cases are related to old age (age-related).

=== Genetic ===
Hearing loss can be inherited. More than 40 genes have been implicated in deafness. There are 300 syndromes with related hearing loss, and each syndrome may have causative genes.

Recessive, dominant, X-linked, or mitochondrial genetic mutations can affect the structure or metabolism of the inner ear. Some may be single point mutations, whereas others are due to chromosomal abnormalities. Some genetic causes lead to a late-onset hearing loss. Mitochondrial mutations can cause SNHL, i.e., m.1555A>G, which makes the individual sensitive to the ototoxic effects of aminoglycoside antibiotics.

- The most common cause of recessive genetic congenital hearing impairment in developed countries is DFNB1, also known as Connexin 26 deafness or GJB2-related deafness.
- The most common syndromic forms of hearing impairment include (dominant) Stickler syndrome and Waardenburg syndrome, and (recessive) Pendred syndrome and Usher syndrome.
- Mitochondrial mutations causing deafness are rare: MT-TL1 mutations cause MIDD (maternally inherited deafness and diabetes) and other conditions, which may include deafness as part of the picture.
- TMPRSS3 gene was identified by its association with both congenital and childhood-onset autosomal recessive deafness. This gene is expressed in fetal cochleae and many other tissues, and is thought to be involved in the development and maintenance of the inner ear or the contents of the perilymph and endolymph. It was also identified as a tumor-associated gene that is overexpressed in ovarian tumors.
- Charcot–Marie–Tooth disease an inherited neurological disorder with delayed onset that can affect the ears as well as other organs. The hearing loss in this condition is often ANSD (auditory neuropathy spectrum disorder), a neural cause of hearing loss.
- Muckle–Wells syndrome, a rare inherited autoinflammatory disorder, can lead to hearing loss.
- Autoimmune disease: Although probably rare, it is possible for autoimmune processes to target the cochlea specifically, without symptoms affecting other organs. Granulomatosis with polyangiitis, an autoimmune condition, may precipitate hearing loss.

=== Congenital ===
- Infections:
  - Congenital rubella syndrome, CRS, results from transplacental transmission of the rubella virus during pregnancy. CRS has been controlled by universal vaccination (MMR or MMRV vaccine).
  - Cytomegalovirus (CMV) infection is the most common cause of progressive sensorineural hearing loss in children. It is a common viral infection contracted by contact with infected bodily fluids such as saliva or urine and easily transmitted in nurseries, and thus from toddlers to expectant mothers. CMV infection during pregnancy can affect the developing foetus and lead to learning difficulties as well as hearing loss.
  - Toxoplasmosis, a parasitic disease affecting 23% of the population in the U.S., can cause sensorineural deafness to the fetus in utero.
- Hypoplastic auditory nerves or abnormalities of the cochlea. Abnormal development of the inner ear can occur in some genetic syndromes such as LAMM syndrome (labyrinthine aplasia, microtia, and microdontia), Pendred syndrome, branchio-oto-renal syndrome, CHARGE syndrome
- GATA2 deficiency, a grouping of several disorders caused by a common defect, viz., familial or sporadic inactivating mutations in one of the two parental GATA2 genes. These autosomal dominant mutations cause a reduction, i.e., a haploinsufficiency, in the cellular levels of the gene's product, GATA2. The GATA2 protein is a transcription factor critical for the embryonic development, maintenance, and functionality of blood-forming, lympathic-forming, and other tissue-forming stem cells. As a result of these mutations, cellular GATA2 levels are low, and individuals develop hematological, immunological, lymphatic, and/or other disorders over time. GATA2 deficiency-induced abnormalities in the lymphatic system are proposed to be responsible for a failure in generating the perilymphatic space around the inner ear's semicircular canals, which in turn underlies the development of sensorineural hearing loss.

=== Presbycusis ===
Progressive age-related loss of hearing acuity or sensitivity can start as early as age 18, primarily affecting the high frequencies, and men more than women. Such losses may not become apparent until much later in life. Presbycusis is by far the dominant cause of sensorineural hearing loss in industrialized societies. A study conducted in Sudan, with a population free from loud noise exposures, found significantly fewer cases of hearing loss when compared with age-matched cases from an industrialized country. Similar findings were reported by a study conducted of a population from Easter island, which reported worse hearing among those that spent time in industrialized countries when compared with those that never left the island. Researchers have argued that factors other than differences in noise exposure, such as genetic makeup, might also have contributed to the findings. Hearing loss that worsens with age but is caused by factors other than normal aging, such as noise-induced hearing loss, is not presbycusis, although differentiating the individual effects of multiple causes of hearing loss can be difficult. About one in three people aged 65 to 74 has hearing loss, and nearly half of those older than 75 have difficulty hearing. There is no known way to prevent age-related hearing loss.

==== Noise ====
Most people living in modern society have some degree of progressive sensorineural (i.e., permanent) noise-induced hearing loss (NIHL) resulting from overloading and damaging the sensory or neural apparatus of hearing in the inner ear. NIHL is typically a drop-out or notch centered at 4000 Hz. Both intensity (SPL) and duration of exposure, as well as repetitive exposure to unsafe noise levels, contribute to cochlear damage resulting in hearing loss. The louder the noise, the shorter the safe amount of exposure is. NIHL can be either permanent or temporary, known as a threshold shift. Unsafe levels of noise can be as little as 70 dB (about twice as loud as normal conversation) if there is prolonged (24-hour) or continuous exposure. 125 dB (a loud rock concert is ~120 dB) is the pain level; sounds above this level cause instant and permanent ear damage.

Noise and ageing are the primary causes of presbycusis, or age-related hearing loss, the most common kind of hearing loss in industrial society. The dangers of environmental and occupational noise exposure are widely recognized. Numerous national and international organizations have established standards for safe levels of exposure to noise in industry, the environment, military, transportation, agriculture, mining and other areas. (Note: A few prominent ones are American National Standards Institute (ANSI), International Organization for Standardization (ISO), Deutsches Institut für Normung (DIN), Swedish Standards Institute (SSI), Canadian Standards Association (CSA), British Standards Institute (BSI), Austrian Standards International(ÖNORM), and in the United States, Environmental Protection Agency (EPA), Occupational Safety and Health Administration (OSHA) and numerous state agencies, and Department of Defense (DOD) among others.) Sound intensity or sound pressure level (SPL) is measured in decibels (dB). For reference:

db Level	Example
45 dB	Ambient noise level around the home
60 dB	Quiet office
60–65 dB	Normal conversation
70 dB	City street noise at 25 ft (7.6 m) or average TV audio
80 dB	Noisy office
95–104 dB	Nightclub dance floor
120 dB	Close-by thunder or a loud rock concert
150–160 dB	Gunshot from a handheld gun

An increase of 6 dB represents a doubling of the SPL, or energy of the sound wave, and therefore its propensity to cause ear damage. Because human ears hear logarithmically, not linearly, it takes an increase of 10 dB to produce a sound that is perceived to be twice as loud. Ear damage due to noise is proportional to sound intensity, not perceived loudness, so it is misleading to rely on subjective perception of loudness as an indication of the risk to hearing, i.e., it can significantly underestimate the danger.

While the standards differ moderately in levels of intensity and duration of exposure considered safe, some guidelines can be derived. (Note: The various standards quantify nose exposure with a set of specified measures, usually with respect to a reference exposure time of 8 hours, a typical working day. The measures include a weighting scale (usually A) with a sample time, a threshold value in dB, a criterion sound pressure level in dB with an exposure time usually in hours, and an exchange rate in dB. A weighted SPL is denoted dB(X), where X is a weighting scale, usually A, but sometimes C. (A) refers to A-weighting of SPL, which is an adjustment to measured SPL to compensate for the frequency response of the human ear, which is less sensitive to low frequencies. The criterion level is the average sound pressure level permitted over the exposure time. The threshold sound pressure level is the level above which sound will be integrated into the average. The sample time (fast, slow, or impulse) is the rate of sampling — a slow sample time is 1 second; a fast sample time is 1/8 second, and an impulse sample time is 35 milliseconds. The effect of a slower sample time means that very short-duration sounds may not be fully sampled (or even sampled at all in rare cases), so the noise exposure may be underestimated. The exchange rate is the amount by which the permitted sound level may increase if the exposure time is halved.)

The safe amount of exposure is reduced by a factor of 2 for every exchange rate (3 dB for NIOSH standard or 5 dB for OSHA standard) increase in SPL. For example, the safe daily exposure amount at 85 dB (90 dB for OSHA) is 8 hours, while the safe exposure at 94 dB(A) (nightclub level) is only 1 hour. Noise trauma can also cause a reversible hearing loss, called a temporary threshold shift. This typically occurs in individuals who are exposed to gunfire or firecrackers and hear ringing in their ears after the event (tinnitus).

- Ambient environmental noise: Populations living near airports, railyards and train stations, freeways and industrial areas are exposed to levels of noise typically in the 65 to 75 dBA range. If lifestyles include significant outdoor or open window conditions, these exposures over time can degrade hearing. U.S. Dept. of Housing and Urban Development sets standards for noise impact in residential and commercial construction zones. HUD's noise standards may be found in 24 CFR Part 51, Subpart B. Environmental noise above 65 dB defines a noise-impacted area.
- Personal audio electronics: Personal audio equipment such as iPods (iPods often reach 115 decibels or higher), can produce powerful enough sound to cause significant NIHL.
- Acoustic trauma: Exposure to a single event of extremely loud noise (such as explosions) can also cause temporary or permanent hearing loss. A typical source of acoustic trauma is a too-loud music concert.
- Workplace noise: The OSHA standards 1910.95 General Industry Occupational Noise Exposure and 1926.52 Construction Industry Occupational Noise Exposure identify the level of 90 dB(A) for 8-hour exposure as the level necessary to protect workers from hearing loss.

==== Disease or disorder ====
- Inflammatory
  - Suppurative labyrinthitis or otitis interna (inflammation of the inner ear)
- Diabetes mellitus According to the American Diabetes Association, hearing loss is twice as common in people with diabetes as in those without it. Also, of the 115 million adults in the U.S. who have prediabetes, the rate of hearing loss is 30 percent higher than in those with normal blood glucose. It has not been established how diabetes is related to hearing loss. It is possible that the high blood glucose levels associated with diabetes cause damage to the small blood vessels in the inner ear, similar to the way in which diabetes can damage the eyes and the kidneys. Similar studies have shown a possible link between hearing loss and neuropathy (nerve damage).
- Tumor
  - Cerebellopontine angle tumour (junction of the pons and the cerebellum) – the cerebellopontine angle is the exit site of both the facial nerve (CN7) and the vestibulocochlear nerve (CN8). Patients with these tumors often have signs and symptoms corresponding to compression of both nerves.
    - Acoustic neuroma (vestibular schwannoma) – benign neoplasm of Schwann cells affecting the vestibulocochlear nerve
    - Meningioma – benign tumour of the pia and arachnoid mater
- Ménière's disease – causes sensorineural hearing loss in the low frequency range (125 Hz to 1000 Hz). Ménière's disease is characterized by sudden attacks of vertigo, lasting minutes to hours, preceded by tinnitus, aural fullness, and fluctuating hearing loss. It is relatively rare and commonly overdiagnosed.
- Bacterial meningitis, e.g., pneumococcal, meningococcal, Haemophilus influenzae, may damage the cochlea – hearing loss is one of the most common after-effects of bacterial meningitis. It has been estimated that 30% of bacterial meningitis cases result in mild to profound hearing loss. Children are most at risk: seventy percent of all bacterial meningitis occurs in young children under the age of five.
- Viral
  - AIDS and ARC patients frequently experience auditory system anomalies.
  - Mumps(epidemic parotitis) may result in profound sensorineural hearing loss (90 dB or more), unilaterally (one ear) or bilaterally (both ears).
  - Measles may result in auditory nerve damage, but more commonly gives a mixed (sensorineural plus conductive) hearing loss, and can be bilateral.
  - Ramsay Hunt syndrome type II (herpes zoster oticus)
- Bacterial
  - Syphilis is commonly transmitted from pregnant women to their fetuses, and about a third of the infected children will eventually become deaf.

==== Ototoxic and neurotoxic drugs and chemicals ====
Some over-the-counter as well as prescription drugs and certain industrial chemicals are ototoxic. Exposure to these can result in temporary or permanent hearing loss.

Some medications cause irreversible ear damage, limiting their use. The most important group is the aminoglycosides (main member gentamicin). A rare mitochondrial mutation, m.1555A>G, can increase an individual's susceptibility to the ototoxic effect of aminoglycosides. Long-term heavy use of hydrocodone (Vicodin) is known to cause rapidly progressing sensorineural hearing loss, usually without vestibular symptoms. Methotrexate, a chemotherapy agent, is also known to cause hearing loss. In most cases, hearing loss does not recover when the drug is stopped. Paradoxically, methotrexate is also used in the treatment of autoimmune-induced inflammatory hearing loss.

Various other medications may reversibly degrade hearing. This includes loop diuretics, sildenafil (Viagra), high or sustained dosing of NSAIDs (aspirin, ibuprofen, naproxen, and various prescription drugs: celecoxib, etc.), quinine, and macrolide antibiotics (erythromycin, etc.). Cytotoxic agents such as carboplatinum, used to treat malignancies, can give rise to a dose-dependent SNHL, as can drugs such as desferrioxamine, used for haematological disorders such as thalassaemia; patients prescribed these drugs need to have their hearing monitored.

Prolonged or repeated environmental or work-related exposure to ototoxic chemicals can also result in sensorineural hearing loss. Some of these chemicals are:

- Butyl nitrite – chemical used recreationally known as 'poppers'
- Carbon disulfide – a solvent used as a building block in many organic reactions
- Styrene, an industrial chemical precursor of polystyrene, a plastic
- Carbon monoxide, a poisonous gas resulting from incomplete combustion
- Heavy metals: tin, lead, manganese, mercury
- Hexane, an industrial solvent and one of the significant constituents of gasoline
- Ethylbenzene, an industrial solvent used in the production of styrene
- Toluene and xylene, highly poisonous petrochemical solvents. Toluene is a component of high-octane gasoline; xylene is used in the production of polyester fibers and resins.
- Trichloroethylene, an industrial degreasing solvent
- Organophosphate pesticides

==== Head trauma ====
There can be damage either to the ear itself or to the central auditory pathways that process the information conveyed by the ears. People who sustain a head injury are susceptible to hearing loss or tinnitus, either temporary or permanent. Contact sports like football (U.S. NFL), hockey, and cricket have a notable incidence of head injuries (concussions). In one survey of retired NFL players, all of whom reported one or more concussions during their playing careers, 25% had hearing loss and 50% had tinnitus.

==== Perinatal conditions ====
These are much more common in premature babies, particularly those under 1,500 g (53 oz) at birth. Premature birth can be associated with problems that result in sensorineural hearing loss, such as anoxia or hypoxia (poor oxygen levels), jaundice, intracranial haemorrhages, and meningitis. Fetal alcohol syndrome is reported to cause hearing loss in up to 64% of infants born to alcoholic mothers, from the ototoxic effect on the developing fetus, plus malnutrition during pregnancy from the excess alcohol intake.

==== Iodine deficiency / hypothyroidism ====
Iodine deficiency and endemic hypothyroidism are associated with hearing loss. If a pregnant mother has insufficient iodine intake during pregnancy it affects the development of the inner ear in the foetus leading to sensorineural deafness. This occurs in certain areas of the world, such as the Himalayas, where iodine is deficient in the soil and thus the diet. In these areas, there is a high incidence of endemic goitre. This cause of deafness is prevented by adding iodine to salt.

==== Brain stroke ====
Brain stroke in a region affecting auditory function such as a posterior circulation infarct has been associated with deafness.

== Pathophysiology ==
Sensory hearing loss is caused by abnormal structure or function of the hair cells of the organ of Corti in the cochlea. Neural hearing impairments are consequent upon damage to the eighth cranial nerve (the vestibulocochlear nerve) or the auditory tracts of the brainstem. If higher levels of the auditory tract are affected, this is known as central deafness. Central deafness may present as sensorineural deafness, but should be distinguishable from the history and audiological testing.

=== Cochlear dead regions in sensory hearing loss ===
Hearing impairment may be associated with damage to the hair cells in the cochlea. Sometimes there may be a complete loss of function of inner hair cells (IHCs) over a certain region of the cochlea; this is called a "dead region". The region can be defined in terms of the range of characteristic frequencies (CFs) of the IHCs and/or neurons immediately adjacent to the dead region.

==== Cochlear hair cells ====
Figure 3: Cross-section of the cochlea

Outer hair cells (OHCs) contribute to the structure of the Organ of Corti, which is situated between the basilar membrane and the tectorial membrane within the cochlea (See Figure 3). The tunnel of Corti, which runs through the Organ of Corti, divides the OHCs and the inner hair cells (IHCs). OHCs are connected to the reticular lamina and the Deiters' cells. There are roughly twelve thousand OHCs in each human ear, and these are arranged in up to five rows. Each OHC has small tufts of 'hairs', or cilia, on its upper surface known as stereocilia, and these are also arranged into rows which are graded in height. There are approximately 140 stereocilia on each OHC.

The fundamental role of the OHCs and the IHCs is to function as sensory receptors. The main function of the IHCs is to transmit sound information via afferent neurons. They do this by transducing mechanical movements or signals into neural activity. When stimulated, the stereocilia on the IHCs move, causing a flow of electric current to pass through the hair cells. This electric current creates action potentials within the connected afferent neurons.

OHCs differ in that they actually contribute to the active mechanism of the cochlea. They do this by receiving mechanical signals or vibrations along the basilar membrane and transducing them into electrochemical signals. The stereocilia found on OHCs are in contact with the tectorial membrane. Therefore, when the basilar membrane moves due to vibrations, the stereocilia bend. The direction in which they bend dictates the firing rate of the auditory neurons connected to the OHCs.

The bending of the stereocilia towards the basal body of the OHC causes excitation of the hair cell. Thus, an increase in the firing rate of the auditory neurons connected to the hair cell occurs. On the other hand, the bending of the stereocilia away from the basal body of the OHC causes inhibition of the hair cell. Thus, a decrease in the firing rate of the auditory neurons connected to the hair cell occurs. OHCs are unique in that they can contract and expand (electromotility). Therefore, in response to the electrical stimulations provided by the efferent nerve supply, they can alter in length, shape, and stiffness. These changes influence the response of the basilar membrane to sound. It is therefore clear that the OHCs play a major role in the active processes of the cochlea. The main function of the active mechanism is to finely tune the basilar membrane and provide it with a high sensitivity to quiet sounds. The active mechanism is dependent on the cochlea being in good physiological condition. However, the cochlea is very susceptible to damage.

===== Hair cell damage =====
SNHL is most commonly caused by damage to the OHCs and the IHCs. There are two methods by which they might become damaged. Firstly, the entire hair cell might die. Secondly, the stereocilia might become distorted or destroyed. Damage to the cochlea can occur in several ways, for example, by viral infection, exposure to ototoxic chemicals, and intense noise exposure. Damage to the OHCs results in either a less effective active mechanism or may not function at all. OHCs contribute to providing a high sensitivity to quiet sounds at a specific frequency range (approximately 2–4 kHz). Thus, damage to the OHCs results in the reduction of sensitivity of the basilar membrane to weak sounds. Amplification of these sounds is therefore required for the basilar membrane to respond efficiently. IHCs are less susceptible to damage in comparison to the OHCs. However, if they become damaged, this will result in an overall loss of sensitivity.

=== Neural tuning curves ===
==== Frequency selectivity ====
Figure 4: Neural tuning curve for normal hearing

The traveling wave along the basilar membrane peaks at different places along it, depending on whether the sound is low or high frequency. Due to the mass and stiffness of the basilar membrane, low-frequency waves peak in the apex, while high-frequency sounds peak in the basal end of the cochlea. Therefore, each position along the basilar membrane is finely tuned to a particular frequency. These specifically tuned frequencies are referred to as characteristic frequencies (CF).

If a sound entering the ear is displaced from the characteristic frequency, then the strength of response from the basilar membrane will progressively lessen. The input of two separate mechanisms creates the fine-tuning of the basilar membrane. The first mechanism is a linear passive mechanism, which depends on the mechanical structure of the basilar membrane and its surrounding structures. The second mechanism is a non-linear active mechanism, which is primarily dependent on the functioning of the OHCs and the general physiological condition of the cochlea. The base and apex of the basilar membrane differ in stiffness and width, which causes the basilar membrane to respond to varying frequencies differently along its length. The base of the basilar membrane is narrow and stiff, so it responds best to high-frequency sounds. The apex of the basilar membrane is wider and much less stiff in comparison to the base, causing it to respond best to low frequencies.

Neural tuning curves can illustrate this selectivity to certain frequencies. These demonstrate the frequencies a fiber responds to, by showing threshold levels (dB SPL) of auditory nerve fibers as a function of different frequencies. This demonstrates that auditory nerve fibers respond best, and hence have better thresholds at the fiber's characteristic frequency and frequencies immediately surrounding it. The basilar membrane is said to be 'sharply tuned' due to the sharp V-shaped curve, with its 'tip' centered at the auditory fibers' characteristic frequency. This shape shows how few frequencies a fiber responds to. If it were a broader 'V' shape, it would be responding to more frequencies (See Figure 4).

==== IHC vs OHC hearing loss ====
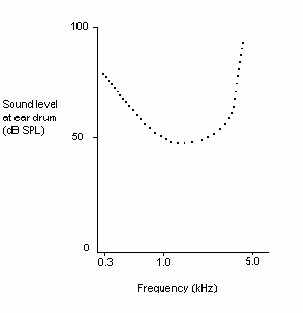
Figure 5: Neural tuning curve for OHC loss. Adapted from.

Figure 6: Neural tuning curve for OHC front row loss and IHC loss. Adapted from.

A normal neural tuning curve is characterised by a broadly tuned low-frequency 'tail', with a finely tuned middle-frequency 'tip'. However, if there is partial or complete damage to the OHCs, with unharmed IHCs, the resulting tuning curve would show the elimination of sensitivity at the quiet sounds. I.e., where the neural tuning curve would normally be most sensitive (at the 'tip') (See Figure 5).

Where both the OHCs and the IHCs are damaged, the resulting neural tuning curve would show the elimination of sensitivity at the 'tip'. However, due to IHC damage, the whole tuning curve becomes raised, giving a loss of sensitivity across all frequencies (See Figure 6). It is only necessary for the first row of OHCs to be damaged for the elimination of the finely tuned 'tip' to occur. This supports the idea that the incidence of OHC damage and thus a loss of sensitivity to quiet sounds occurs more than IHC loss.

When the IHCs or part of the basilar membrane are damaged or destroyed, so that they no longer function as transducers, the result is a 'dead region'. Dead regions can be defined in terms of the characteristic frequencies of the IHC, related to the specific place along the basilar membrane where the dead region occurs. Assuming that there has been no shift in the characteristic frequencies relating to certain regions of the basilar membrane due to the damage to OHCs. This often occurs with IHC damage. Dead regions can also be defined by the anatomical place of the non-functioning IHC (such as an "apical dead region"), or by the characteristic frequencies of the IHC adjacent to the dead region.

=== Dead region audiometry ===
==== Pure tone audiometry (PTA) ====
Dead regions affect audiometric results, but perhaps not in the way expected. For example, it may be expected that thresholds would not be obtained at the frequencies within the dead region, but would be obtained at frequencies adjacent to the dead region. Therefore, assuming normal hearing exists around the dead region, it would produce an audiogram that has a dramatically steep slope between the frequency where a threshold is obtained, and the frequency where a threshold cannot be obtained due to the dead region.

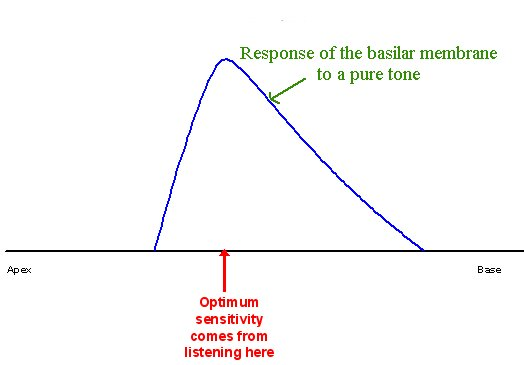
Figure 7: Response of the basilar membrane to a pure tone

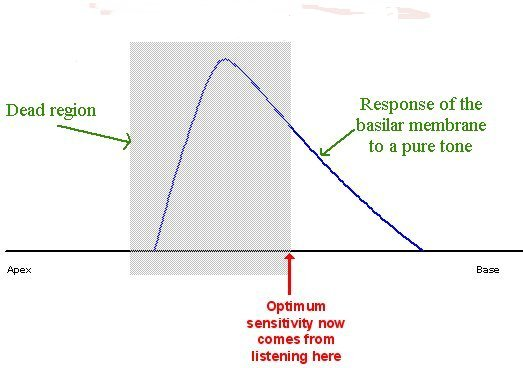
Figure 8: Response of the basilar membrane to a pure tone, when there is a dead region

However, it appears that this is not the case. Dead regions cannot be clearly found via PTA audiograms. This may be because the neurons innervating the dead region cannot react to vibration at their characteristic frequency. If the basilar membrane vibration is large enough, neurons tuned to different characteristic frequencies, such as those adjacent to the dead region, will be stimulated due to the spread of excitation. Therefore, a response from the patient at the test frequency will be obtained. This is referred to as "off-place listening", and is also known as 'off-frequency listening'. This will lead to a false threshold being found. Thus, it appears a person has better hearing than they actually do, resulting in a dead region being missed. Therefore, using PTA alone, it is impossible to identify the extent of a dead region (See Figures 7 and 8).

Consequently, how much is an audiometric threshold affected by a tone with its frequency within a dead region? This depends on the location of the dead region. Thresholds at low-frequency dead regions are more inaccurate than those at higher-frequency dead regions. This has been attributed to the fact that excitation due to vibration of the basilar membrane spreads upwards from the apical regions of the basilar membrane, more than excitation spreads downwards from higher-frequency basal regions of the cochlea. This pattern of the spread of excitation is similar to the 'upward spread of masking' phenomenon. If the tone is sufficiently loud to produce enough excitation at the normally functioning area of the cochlea, it is above that area's threshold. The tone will be detected, due to off-frequency listening, which results in a misleading threshold.

To help overcome the issue of PTA producing inaccurate thresholds within dead regions, masking of the area beyond the dead region that is being stimulated can be used. This means that the threshold of the responding area is sufficiently raised so that it cannot detect the spread of excitation from the tone. This technique has led to the suggestion that a low-frequency dead region may be related to a loss of 40–50 dB. However, as one of the aims of PTA is to determine whether or not there is a dead region, it may be difficult to assess which frequencies to mask without the use of other tests.

Based on research, it has been suggested that a low-frequency dead region may produce a relatively flat loss or a very gradually sloping loss towards the higher frequencies. As the dead region will be less detectable due to the upward spread of excitation. Whereas, there may be a more obvious steeply sloping loss at high frequencies for a high-frequency dead region. Although the slope likely represents the less pronounced downward spread of excitation, rather than accurate thresholds for those frequencies with non-functioning hair cells. Mid-frequency dead regions, with a small range, appear to have less effect on the patient's ability to hear in everyday life, and may produce a notch in the PTA thresholds. Although it is clear that PTA is not the best test to identify a dead region.

==== Psychoacoustic tuning curves (PTC) and threshold equalizing noise (TEN) tests ====
Figure 9: Psychoacoustical tuning curve

Although some debate continues regarding the reliability of such tests, it has been suggested that psychoacoustic tuning curves (PTCs) and threshold-equalising noise (TEN) results may be useful in detecting dead regions, rather than PTA. PTCs are similar to neural tuning curves. They illustrate the level of a masker (dB SPL) tone at threshold, as a function of deviation from center frequency (Hz). They are measured by presenting a fixed low intensity pure tone while also presenting a narrow-band masker, with a varying center frequency. The masker level is varied so that the level of masker needed to just mask the test signal is found for the masker at each center frequency. The tip of the PTC is where the masker level needed to just mask the test signal is the lowest. For normal hearing people this is when the masker center frequency is closest to the frequency of the test signal (See Figure 9).

In the case of dead regions, when the test signal lies within the boundaries of a dead region, the tip of the PTC will be shifted to the edge of the dead region, to the area that is still functioning and detecting the spread of excitation from the signal. In the case of a low-frequency dead region, the tip is shifted upwards, indicating a low-frequency dead region starting at the tip of the curve. For a high frequency dead region, the tip is shifted downwards from the signal frequency to the functioning area below the dead region. However, the traditional method of obtaining PTCs is not practical for clinical use, and it has been argued that TENs are not accurate enough. A fast method for finding PTCs has been developed, and it may provide the solution. However, more research to validate this method is required before it can be accepted clinically.

==== Perceptual consequences of a dead region ====
Audiogram configurations are not good indicators of how a dead region will affect a person functionally, mainly due to individual differences. For example, a sloping audiogram is often present with a dead region, due to the spread of excitation. However, the individual may well be affected differently from someone with a corresponding sloped audiogram caused by partial damage to hair cells rather than a dead region. They will perceive sounds differently, yet the audiogram suggests that they have the same degree of loss. Huss and Moore investigated how hearing-impaired patients perceive pure tones, and found that they perceive tones as noisy and distorted, more (on average) than a person without a hearing impairment. However, they also found that the perception of tones as being like noise was not directly related to frequencies within the dead regions and was therefore not an indicator of a dead region. This suggests that audiograms, and their poor representation of dead regions, are inaccurate predictors of a patient's perception of pure tone quality.

Research by Kluk and Moore has shown that dead regions may also affect the patient's perception of frequencies beyond the dead regions. There is an enhancement in the ability to distinguish between tones that differ very slightly in frequency, in regions just beyond the dead regions, compared to tones further away. An explanation for this may be cortical remapping. Whereby, neurons which would normally be stimulated by the dead region have been reassigned to respond to functioning areas near it. This leads to an over-representation of these areas, resulting in an increased perceptual sensitivity to small frequency differences in tones.

=== Vestibulocochlear nerve pathology ===
- Congenital deformity of the internal auditory canal,
- Neoplastic and pseudo-neoplastic lesions, with special detailed emphasis on schwannoma of the eighth cranial nerve (acoustic neuroma),
- Non-neoplastic Internal Auditory Canal/CerebelloPontine Angle pathology, including vascular loops,

== Diagnosis ==
=== Case history ===
Before examination, a case history guides the context of the hearing loss.

- Major concern
- Pregnancy and childbirth information
- Medical history
- Development history
- Family history

=== Otoscopy ===
Direct examination of the external canal and tympanic membrane (eardrum) with an otoscope, a medical device inserted into the ear canal that uses light to examine the condition of the external ear and tympanic membrane, and middle ear through the semi-translucent membrane.

=== Differential testing ===
Differential testing is most useful when there is unilateral hearing loss and distinguishes conductive from sensorineural loss. These are conducted with a low-frequency tuning fork, usually 512 Hz, and contrast measures of air and bone conducted sound transmission.

- Weber test, in which a tuning fork is touched to the midline of the forehead, localizes to the normal ear in people with unilateral sensorineural hearing loss.
- Rinne test, which tests air conduction vs. bone conduction, is positive, because both bone and air conduction are reduced equally.
- Less common Bing and Schwabach variants of the Rinne test.
- Absolute bone conduction (ABC) test.

Sensorineural vs. Conductive hearing loss
Criteria	Sensorineural hearing loss	Conductive hearing loss
Anatomical site	Inner ear, cranial nerve VIII, or central processing centers	Middle ear (ossicular chain), tympanic membrane, or external ear
Weber test	Sound localizes to normal ear in unilateral SNHL	Sound localizes to the affected ear (ear with conductive loss) in unilateral cases
Rinne test	Positive Rinne; air conduction > bone conduction (both air and bone conduction are decreased equally, but the difference between them is unchanged).	Negative Rinne; bone conduction > air conduction (bone/air gap)

Other, more complex, tests of auditory function are required to distinguish the different types of hearing loss. Bone conduction thresholds can differentiate sensorineural hearing loss from conductive hearing loss. Other tests, such as oto-acoustic emissions, acoustic stapedial reflexes, speech audiometry, and evoked response audiometry, are needed to distinguish sensory, neural, and auditory processing hearing impairments.

=== Tympanometry ===
A tympanogram is the result of a test with a tympanometer. It tests the function of the middle ear and the mobility of the eardrum. It can help identify conductive hearing loss due to disease of the middle ear or eardrum from other kinds of hearing loss, including SNHL.

=== Audiometry ===
An audiogram is the result of a hearing test. The most common type of hearing test is pure tone audiometry (PTA). It charts the thresholds of hearing sensitivity at a selection of standard frequencies between 250 and 8000 Hz. There is also high-frequency pure tone audiometry, which tests frequencies from 8000 to 20,000 Hz. PTA can be used to differentiate between conductive hearing loss, sensorineural hearing loss, and mixed hearing loss. A hearing loss can be described by its degree, i.e., mild, moderate, severe, or profound, or by its shape, i.e., high frequency or sloping, low frequency or rising, notched, U-shaped or 'cookie-bite', peaked or flat.

There are also other kinds of audiometry designed to test hearing acuity rather than sensitivity (speech audiometry), or to test auditory neural pathway transmission (evoked response audiometry).

=== Magnetic resonance imaging ===
MRI scans can be used to identify gross structural causes of hearing loss. They are used for congenital hearing loss when changes to the shape of the inner ear or nerve of hearing may help diagnose the cause of the hearing loss. They are also useful in cases where a tumour is suspected or to determine the degree of damage in a hearing loss caused by bacterial infection or autoimmune disease. Scanning is of no value in age-related deafness.

== Prevention ==
Presbycusis is the leading cause of SNHL and is progressive and nonpreventable, and at this time, heredity-related SNHL cannot be countered by either somatic or gene therapy. But other causes of acquired SNHL are largely preventable, especially nosocusis type causes. This would involve avoiding environmental noise and traumatic noise, such as rock concerts and nightclubs with loud music. Use of noise attenuation measures like ear plugs is an alternative, as well as learning about the noise levels one is exposed to. Currently, several accurate sound level measurement apps exist. Reducing exposure time can also help manage risk from loud exposures.

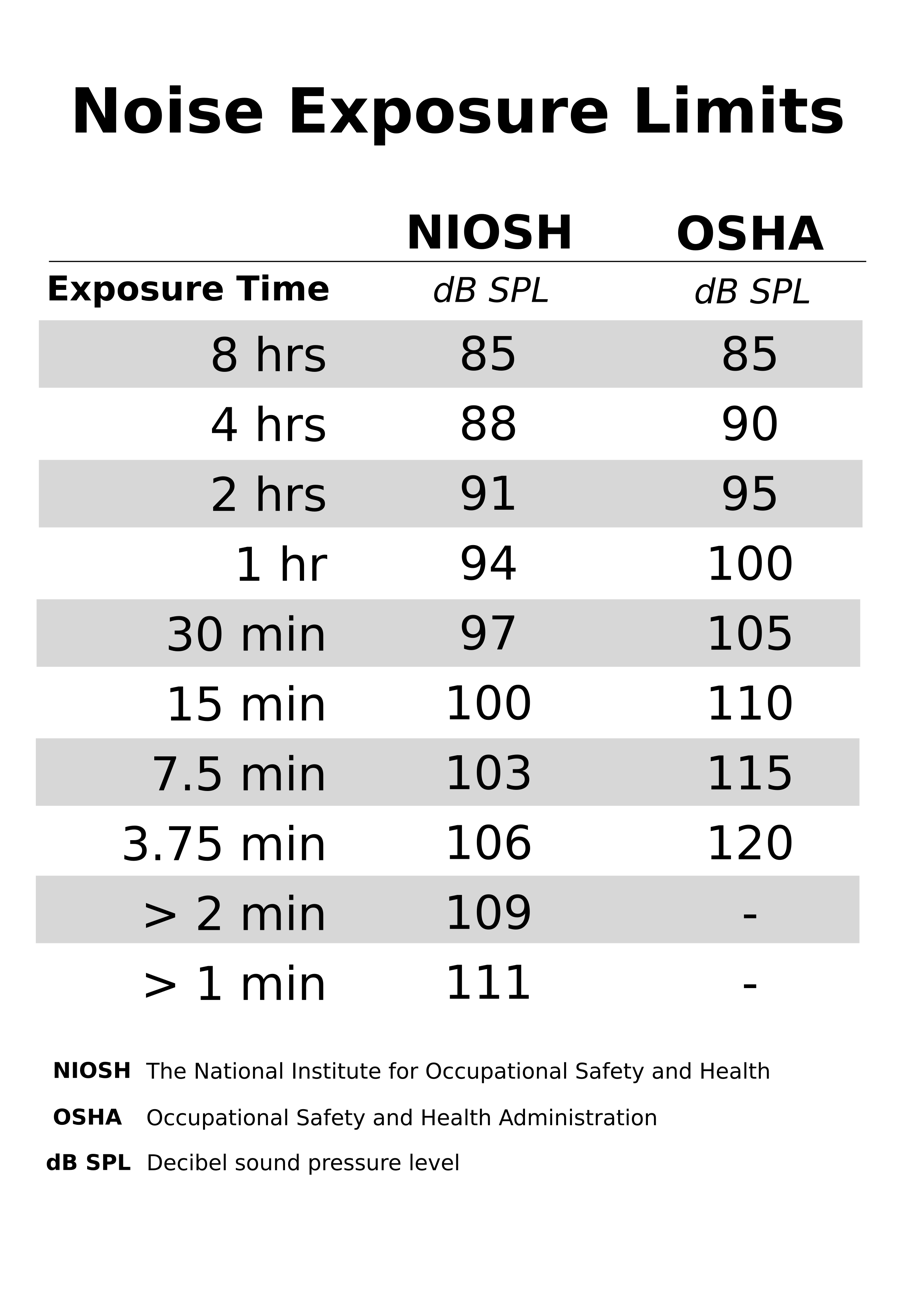
Noise exposure limits

== Treatment ==
Treatment modalities fall into three categories: pharmacological, surgical, and management. As SNHL is a physiologic degradation and considered permanent, there are currently no approved or recommended treatments.

There have been significant advances in the identification of human deafness genes and elucidation of their cellular mechanisms, as well as their physiological function in mice. Nevertheless, pharmacological treatment options are very limited and clinically unproven. Such pharmaceutical treatments as are employed are palliative rather than curative, and addressed to the underlying cause if one can be identified, to avert progressive damage.

Profound or total hearing loss may be amenable to management by cochlear implants, which stimulate cochlear nerve endings directly. A cochlear implant is a surgical implantation of a battery-powered electronic medical device in the inner ear. Unlike hearing aids, which make sounds louder, cochlear implants do the work of the damaged parts of the inner ear (cochlea) to provide sound signals to the brain. These consist of both internal implanted electrodes and magnets, and external components. The quality of sound is different than natural hearing but may enable the recipient to recognize speech and environmental sounds better. Implants are intended for people who are profoundly deaf or severely hard of hearing.

Management of sensorineural hearing loss involves employing strategies to support existing hearing, such as lip-reading, enhanced communication, etc., and amplification using hearing aids. Hearing aids are specifically tuned to the individual's hearing loss to give maximum benefit.

== Research ==
=== Pharmaceuticals ===
- Antioxidant vitamins – Researchers at the University of Michigan report that a combination of high doses of vitamins A, C, and E, and Magnesium, taken one hour before noise exposure and continued as a once-daily treatment for five days, was very effective at preventing permanent noise-induced hearing loss in animals.
- Tanakan – a brand name for an international prescription drug extract of Ginkgo biloba. It is classified as a vasodilator. Among its research uses is the treatment of sensorineural deafness and tinnitus presumed to be of vascular origin.
- Coenzyme Q_{10} – a substance similar to a vitamin, with antioxidant properties. It is made in the body, but levels fall with age. (Note: Coenzyme Q10(CoQ10) supports mitochondrial function and has significant antioxidant properties (Quinzii 2010). Animal studies have found that supplementation with CoQ10 reduced noise-induced hearing loss and the death of hair cells (Hirose 2008; Fetoni 2009, 2012). Human studies have also yielded promising results, as 160-600 mg of CoQ10 daily was found to reduce hearing loss in people with sudden sensorineural hearing loss and presbycusis (Ahn 2010; Salami 2010; Guastini 2011). Also, a small preliminary trial found that CoQ10 supplementation alleviated tinnitus in those whose CoQ10 blood levels were initially low (Khan 2007). Another small trial found that CoQ10 may slow the progression of hearing loss associated with a mitochondrial genetic mutation (Angeli 2005).)
- Ebselen, a synthetic drug molecule that mimics glutathione peroxidase (GPx), a critical enzyme in the inner ear that protects it from damage caused by loud sounds or noise

=== Stem cell and gene therapy ===
Hair cell regeneration using stem cell and gene therapy is years or decades away from being clinically feasible. However, studies are currently underway on the subject, with the first FDA-approved trial beginning in February 2012.

== Sudden sensorineural hearing loss (SSHL) ==
Unlike other types of hearing loss, sudden sensorineural hearing loss (SSHL or SSNHL) is often treatable if addressed immediately. Commonly known as sudden deafness, it occurs as an unexplained, rapid loss of hearing—usually in one ear—either at once or over several days. It frequently affects only one ear and should be considered a medical emergency. Delaying diagnosis and treatment may render treatment less effective or ineffective.

Experts estimate that SSHL strikes between one and six people per 5,000 every year, typically adults in their 40s and 50s. The actual number of new cases of SSHL each year could be much higher because the condition often goes undiagnosed.

=== Presentation ===
Many people notice that they have SSHL when they wake up in the morning. Others first notice it when they try to use the deafened ear, such as when they use a phone. Still others notice a loud, alarming "pop" just before their hearing disappears. People with sudden deafness often become dizzy, have ringing in their ears (tinnitus), or both.

=== Diagnosis ===
SSHL is diagnosed via pure tone audiometry. If the test shows a loss of at least 30 dB in three adjacent frequencies, the hearing loss is formally diagnosed as SSHL (though the treatments may be effective for any level of sudden hearing loss). For example, a hearing loss of 30 dB would make conversational speech sound more like a whisper.

=== Causes ===
Only 10 to 15 percent of the cases diagnosed as SSHL have an identifiable cause. Most cases are classified as idiopathic, also called sudden idiopathic hearing loss (SIHL) and idiopathic sudden sensorineural hearing loss (ISSHL or ISSNHL) The majority of evidence points to some type of inflammation in the inner ear as the most common cause of SSNHL.

- Infection is believed to be the most common cause of SSNHL, accounting for approximately 13% of cases. Viruses that have been associated with SSNHL include cytomegalovirus, rubella, measles, mumps, human immunodeficiency virus (HIV), herpes simplex virus (HSV), varicella zoster virus (VZV), and West Nile virus. Patients with COVID-19 may also be at increased risk for developing SSNHL.
- Vascular ischemia of the inner ear or cranial nerve VIII (CN8)
- Perilymph fistula, usually due to a rupture of the round or oval windows and the leakage of perilymph. The patient will usually also experience vertigo or imbalance. A history of trauma is usually present, and changes to hearing or vertigo occur with alteration in intracranial pressure, such as with straining, lifting, blowing, etc.
- Autoimmune – can be due to an autoimmune illness such as systemic lupus erythematosus, granulomatosis with polyangiitis

=== Treatment ===
Immediate treatment from an otolaryngologist (sometimes called an ENT surgeon) is needed. The primary treatment for SSHL is oral corticosteroids (such as prednisolone), and two recent formal studies both found that nearly half the patients fully recovered their hearing. The discussions in the Hodokort 2024 paper are very readable, and although it set out to show that higher doses of steroids than normal give better results, it found that the standard German treatment was best (the control), with 45% getting back to normal and at least 84% getting a benefit. The other SeaShel 2024 paper is also very readable, with both systemic steroids and intratympanic injections being used, and again 46% of patients got their hearing audiogram back to normal. The primary treatment was overwhelmingly oral steroids, but over 40% got intratympanic injections at some point (though this did not lead to a greater percentage with full recovery than the Hodokort controls, who all got the same standardized oral treatment). The Seashel paper does not give partial recovery values.

A 2022 literature review indicates that systemic oral steroids are the best choice initially. It says: "For primary therapy, intratympanic corticosteroids may have little or no effect compared with systemic corticosteroids". A 2025 paper includes hyperbaric oxygen therapy (HBOT), which is also sometimes used. Steroid treatment within seven days, a lower initial severity of hearing loss, the absence of vertigo, younger patient age, and a history of cardiovascular disease are all associated with complete hearing recovery.

- Vitamins and antioxidants
- Vasodilators
- Betahistine (Betaserc), an anti-vertigo drug
- Hyperbaric oxygen
- Rheologic agents that reduce blood viscosity (such as hydroxyethyl starch, dextran and pentoxifylline)
- Anti-inflammatory agents, primarily oral corticosteroids (such as prednisone and dexamethasone)
- Intratympanic administration – Gel formulations are under investigation to provide more consistent drug delivery to the inner ear. Local drug delivery can be accomplished through intratympanic administration, a minimally invasive procedure where the ear drum is anesthetized and a drug is administered into the middle ear. From the middle ear, a drug can diffuse across the round window membrane into the inner ear. Intratympanic administration of steroids may be effective for sudden sensorineural hearing loss for some patients, but high-quality clinical data have not been generated. Intratympanic administration of an anti-apoptotic peptide (JNK inhibitor) is currently being evaluated in late-stage clinical development.

=== Epidemiology ===
General hearing loss affects close to 10% of the global population. In the United States alone, it is expected that 13.5 million Americans have sensorineural hearing loss. Of those with sensorineural hearing loss, approximately 50% are congenitally related. The other 50% are due to maternal or fetal infections, post-natal infections, viral infections due to rubella or cytomegalovirus, ototoxic drugs, exposure to loud sounds, severe head trauma, and premature births

Of the genetically related sensorineural hearing loss cases, 75% are autosomal recessive, 15–20% autosomal dominant, and 1–3% sex-linked. While the specific gene and protein is still unknown, mutations in the connexin 26 gene near the DFNB1 locus of chromosome 13 are thought to account for most of the autosomal recessive genetic-related sensorineural hearing loss

At least 8.5 per 1000 children younger than age 18 have sensorineural hearing loss. General hearing loss is proportionally related to age. At least 314 per 1000 people older than age 65 have hearing loss. Several risk factors for sensorineural hearing loss have been studied over the past decade. Osteoporosis, stapedectomy surgery, pneumococcal vaccinations, mobile phone users, and hyperbilirubinemia at birth are among some of the known risk factors.

== See also ==
- Conductive hearing loss, hearing loss caused primarily by conditions in the middle ear
- Cortical deafness, another kind of nerve deafness
- Hearing loss
- Inner ear, the innermost portion of the ear containing the sensorineural apparatus of hearing
- Otosclerosis, a sometimes associated or predecessor conductive hearing loss condition of the middle ear
- Tinnitus, ringing in the ears, a common accompaniment of SNHL
