= Weber test =

Screening test for hearing

Weber test.
- ICD-9-CM: 95.43

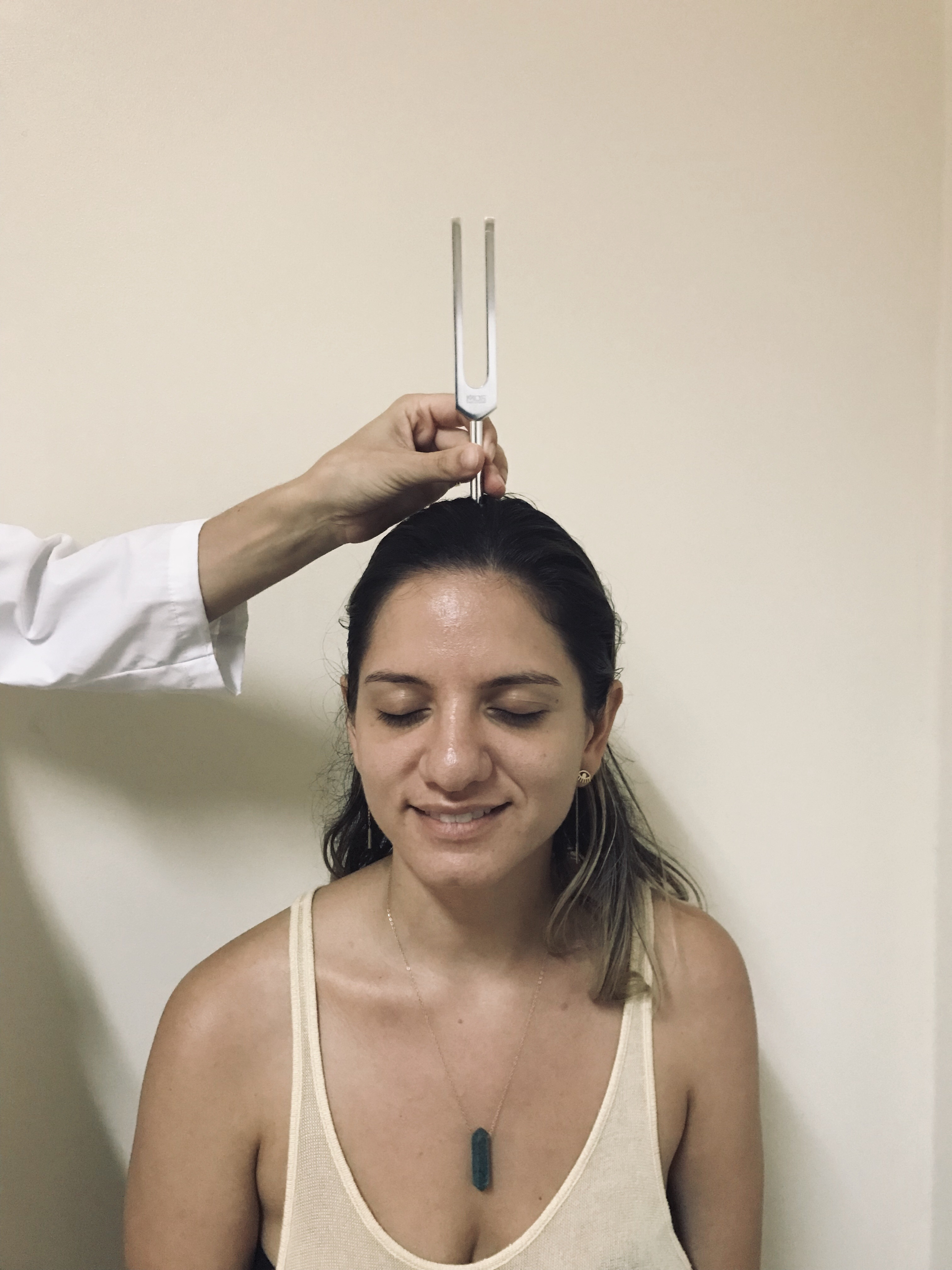
The Weber test is administered by holding a vibrating tuning fork on top of the patient's head.

The Weber test is a screening test for hearing performed with a tuning fork. It can detect unilateral (one-sided) conductive hearing loss (middle ear hearing loss) and unilateral sensorineural hearing loss (inner ear hearing loss). The test is named after Ernst Heinrich Weber (1795–1878). Conductive hearing ability is mediated by the middle ear composed of the ossicles: the malleus, the incus, and the stapes. Sensorineural hearing ability is mediated by the inner ear composed of the cochlea with its internal basilar membrane and attached cochlear nerve (cranial nerve VIII). The outer ear consisting of the pinna, ear canal, and ear drum or tympanic membrane transmits sounds to the middle ear but does not contribute to the conduction or sensorineural hearing ability save for hearing transmissions limited by cerumen impaction (wax collection in the ear canal).

The Weber test has had its value as a screening test questioned in the literature.

== Weber test performance ==
The Weber and the Rinne test (/ˈrɪnə/ RIN-ə) are typically performed together when the results of each combined to determine the location and nature of any hearing losses detected. In the Weber test a vibrating tuning fork (Typically 256 Hz or 512 Hz used for Weber vibration test; 512 Hz used for Rinne hearing test) is placed in the middle of the forehead, above the upper lip under the nose over the teeth, or on top of the head equidistant from the patient's ears on top of thin skin in contact with the bone. The patient is asked to report in which ear the sound is heard louder. A normal Weber test has a patient reporting the sound heard equally in both sides. In an affected patient, if the defective ear hears the Weber tuning fork louder, the finding indicates a conductive hearing loss in the defective ear. Also in the affected patient, if the normal ear hears the tuning fork sound better, there is sensorineural hearing loss on the other (defective) ear. However, this assumes that it is known which ear is defective and which is normal (e.g. by the patient telling the clinician that they cannot hear as well in one ear as in the other), when the testing is being done to characterize the type, conductive or sensorineural, of hearing loss that is occurring. In the case where the patient is unaware or has acclimated to their hearing loss, the clinician has to use the Rinne test in conjunction with the Weber to characterize and localize any deficits. That is, an abnormal Weber test is only able to tell the clinician that there is a conductive loss in the ear which hears better or that there is a sensorineural loss in the ear which does not hear as well.

For the Rinne test, a vibrating tuning fork (typically 512 Hz) is placed initially on the mastoid process behind each ear until sound is no longer heard. Then, without re-striking the fork, the fork is then quickly placed just outside the ear with the patient asked to report when the sound caused by the vibration is no longer heard. A normal or positive Rinne test is when sound is still heard when the tuning fork is moved to the air near the ear (air conduction or AC), indicating that AC is equal or greater than bone conduction (or BC). Therefore, AC > BC; which is how it is reported clinically for a normal or positive Rinne result. In conductive hearing loss, bone conduction is better than air or BC > AC, a negative Rinne, if the patient reports that they do not hear the fork once it is moved. The Rinne test is not ideal for distinguishing sensorineural hearing loss, as both sensorineural hearing loss and normal hearing report a positive Rinne test (though the sensorineural patient will have a decreased duration of hearing sound once the fork is moved to air).

In a normal patient, the Weber tuning fork sound is heard equally loudly in both ears, with no one ear hearing the sound louder than the other (lateralization). Similarly, a patient with symmetrical hearing loss will hear the Weber tuning fork sound equally well, with diagnostic utility only in asymmetric (one-sided) hearing losses. In a patient with hearing loss, the Weber tuning fork sound is heard louder in one ear (lateralization) than the other. This clinical finding should be confirmed by repeating the procedure and having the patient occlude one ear with a finger; the sound should be heard best in the occluded ear.

The results of both tests are noted and compared accordingly below to localize and characterize the nature of any detected hearing losses. Note: the Weber and Rinne are screening tests that are not replacements for formal audiometry hearing tests. Reported test accuracy measurements are very variable for clinical screening, surgical candidacy assessments, and estimation of hearing loss severity.

Weber test Rinne test		lateralizes to left		no lateralization	lateralizes to right	
left ear	right ear	left ear	right ear	both ears	left ear	right ear
⊕	⊕	Normal	SN loss	Normal	SN loss	Normal
⊕	⊕	Normal	SN loss	SN loss	SN loss	Normal
⊖	⊕	Conductive loss	Normal	(no such condition)	Combined loss	Normal
⊕	⊖	Normal	Combined loss	(no such condition)	Normal	Conductive loss
⊖	⊖	Conductive loss	Combined loss	Conductive loss	Combined loss	Conductive loss
SN loss = Sensorineural loss, Combined loss = Conductive & Sensorineural loss

== Detection of air conductive hearing loss ==
A patient with a unilateral conductive hearing loss would hear the tuning fork loudest in the affected ear. This is because the ear with the conductive hearing loss is only receiving input from the bone conduction and no air conduction, and the sound is perceived as louder in that ear. This finding is due to the conduction problem of the middle ear (incus, malleus, stapes, and external auditory meatus) which masks the ambient noise of the room, while the well-functioning inner ear (cochlea with its basilar membrane) picks the sound up via the bones of the skull, causing it to be perceived as a louder sound in the affected ear. Another theory, however, is based on the occlusion effect described by Tonndorf et al, in 1966. Lower frequency sounds (as made by the 256 Hz fork) that are transferred through the bone to the ear canal escape from the canal. If an occlusion is present, the sound cannot escape and appears louder on the ear with the conductive hearing loss.

Conductive hearing loss can be mimicked by plugging one ear with a finger and performing the Rinne and Weber tests, which will help clarify the above. Humming a constant note and then plugging one ear is a good way to mimic the findings of the Weber test in conductive hearing loss. The simulation of the Weber test is the basis for the Bing test.

== Detection of sensorineural hearing loss ==
If air conduction is intact on both sides (therefore no CHL), the patient will report a quieter sound in the ear with the sensorineuronal hearing loss. This is because the ear with the sensorineuronal hearing loss is not converting input from either the air or bone conduction, and the sound is perceived as louder in the normal ear.

== Considerations and limitations ==
This Weber test is most useful in individuals with hearing that is different between the two ears. It cannot confirm normal hearing because it does not measure sound sensitivity in a quantitative manner. Hearing defects affecting both ears equally, as in presbycusis will produce an apparently normal test result.

Weber test considerations The Weber test reflects conduction loss in the ipsilateral ear because, in the event of impaired conduction, ipsilateral sensorineural hearing is perceived as louder; this is the same reason humming becomes more salient when covering the ears. If the Weber-lateralized ear has a positive Rinne test (AC>BC), that generally means the absence of conduction loss in that ear, and the reason sound had been perceived as louder on that side is because a sensorineural loss is present contralaterally; an ipsilateral negative Rinne test (BC>AC), on the other hand, would confirm ipsilateral conductive hearing loss (although contralateral sensorineural hearing loss may still be present. If the Weber-lateralized ear has a positive Rinne test and the contralateral ear has a negative Rinne test, then both conductive and sensorineural hearing loss are present in the contralateral ear. This is because sensorineural deficits always take auditory precedence over conductive ones, so even though conductive hearing loss is present in the contralateral ear, it is the sensorineural deficit that is responsible for the ipsilateral perceived elevation of volume. This also means that a Weber-lateralized ear with bilateral negative-Rinne corresponds to only sensorineural hearing on the ipsilateral side not being affected.

Rinne test considerations Although there is no replacement for formal audiometry, a quick screening test can be made by complementing the Weber test with the Rinne test.

The Rinne test is used in cases of unilateral hearing loss and establishes which ear has the greater bone conduction. Combined with the patient's perceived hearing loss, it can be determined if the cause is sensorineural or conductive. For example, if the Rinne test shows that air conduction (AC) is greater than bone conduction (BC) in both ears and the Weber test lateralizes to a particular ear, then there is sensorineural hearing loss in the opposite (weaker) ear. Conductive hearing loss is confirmed in the weaker ear if bone conduction is greater than air conduction and the Weber test lateralizes to that side. Combined hearing loss is likely if the Weber test lateralizes to the stronger ear and bone conduction is greater than air conduction in the weaker ear.

== See also ==
- Rinne test
