= Tuning fork =

Device that generates sounds of constant pitch when struck

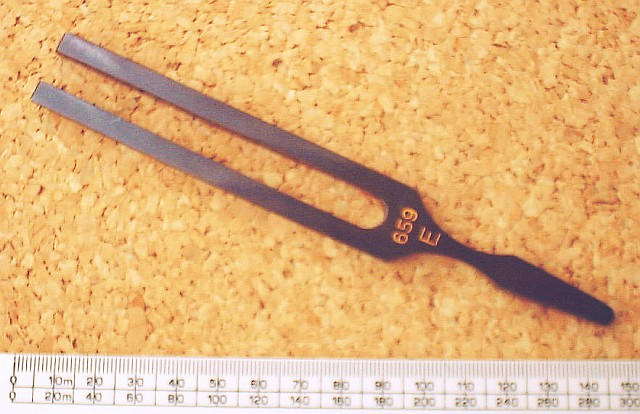
Tuning fork by John Walker stamped with note (E) and frequency in hertz (659)

A tuning fork is an acoustic resonator in the form of a two-pronged fork with the prongs (tines) formed from a U-shaped bar of elastic metal (usually steel). It resonates at a specific constant pitch when set vibrating by striking it against a surface or with an object, and emits a pure musical tone once the high overtones fade out. A tuning fork's pitch depends on the length and mass of the two prongs. They are traditional sources of standard pitch for tuning musical instruments.

The tuning fork was invented in 1711 by British musician John Shore, sergeant trumpeter and lutenist to the royal court.

== Description ==
Motion of an A-440 tuning fork (greatly exaggerated) vibrating in its principal mode

A tuning fork is a fork-shaped acoustic resonator used in many applications to produce a fixed tone. The main reason for using the fork shape is that, unlike many other types of resonators, it produces a very pure tone, with most of the vibrational energy at the fundamental frequency. The reason for this is that the frequency of the first overtone is about 5^{2}/2^{2} = 25/4 = 6 1/4 times the fundamental (about 2 1/2 octaves above it). By comparison, the first overtone of a vibrating string or metal bar is one octave above (twice) the fundamental, so when the string is plucked or the bar is struck, its vibrations tend to mix the fundamental and overtone frequencies. When the tuning fork is struck, little of the energy goes into the overtone modes; they also die out correspondingly faster, leaving a pure sine wave at the fundamental frequency. It is easier to tune other instruments with this pure tone.

Another reason for using the fork shape is that it can then be held at the base without damping the oscillation. That is because its principal mode of vibration is symmetric, with the two prongs always moving in opposite directions, so that at the base where the two prongs meet there is a node (point of no vibratory motion) which can therefore be handled without removing energy from the oscillation (damping). However, there is still a tiny motion induced in the handle in its longitudinal direction (thus at right angles to the oscillation of the prongs) which can be made audible using any sort of sound board. Thus by pressing the tuning fork's base against a sound board such as a wooden box, table top, or bridge of a musical instrument, this small motion, but which is at a high acoustic pressure (thus a very high acoustic impedance), is partly converted into audible sound in air which involves a much greater motion (particle velocity) at a relatively low pressure (thus low acoustic impedance). The pitch of a tuning fork can also be heard directly through bone conduction, by pressing the tuning fork against the bone just behind the ear, or even by holding the stem of the fork in one's teeth, conveniently leaving both hands free. Bone conduction using a tuning fork is specifically used in the Weber and Rinne tests for hearing in order to bypass the middle ear. If just held in open air, the sound of a tuning fork is very faint due to the acoustic impedance mismatch between the steel and air. Moreover, since the feeble sound waves emanating from each prong are 180° out of phase, those two opposite waves interfere, largely cancelling each other. Thus when a solid sheet is slid in between the prongs of a vibrating fork, the apparent volume actually increases, as this cancellation is reduced, just as a loudspeaker requires a baffle in order to radiate efficiently.

Commercial tuning forks are tuned to the correct pitch at the factory, and the pitch and frequency in hertz is stamped on them. They can be retuned by filing material off the prongs. Filing the ends of the prongs raises the pitch, while filing the inside of the base of the prongs lowers it.

Currently, the most common tuning fork sounds the note of A = 440 Hz, the standard concert pitch that many orchestras use. That A is the pitch of the violin's second-highest string, the highest string of the viola, and an octave above the highest string of the cello. Orchestras between 1750 and 1820 mostly used A = 423.5 Hz, though there were many forks and many slightly different pitches. Standard tuning forks are available that vibrate at all the pitches within the central octave of the piano, and also other pitches.

Tuning fork pitch varies slightly with temperature, due mainly to a slight decrease in the modulus of elasticity of steel with increasing temperature. A change in frequency of 48 parts per million per °F (86 ppm per °C) is typical for a steel tuning fork. The frequency decreases (becomes flat) with increasing temperature. Tuning forks are manufactured to have their correct pitch at a standard temperature. The standard temperature is now 20 °C (68 °F), but 15 °C (59 °F) is an older standard. The pitch of other instruments is also subject to variation with temperature change.

== Calculation of frequency ==
The frequency of a tuning fork depends on its dimensions and what it is made from. Using the Euler-Bernoulli beam model, the fundamental frequency of the tuning fork is:

$$f = \frac{\alpha^2}{2\pi L^2} \sqrt\frac{EI}{\rho A},$$

where

f is the frequency the fork vibrates at, (SI units: Hz or 1/s)
α ≈ 1.875 is the smallest positive real solution to cos(α)cosh(α) = −1, which arises from the boundary conditions of the prong's cantilevered structure.
L is the length of the prongs, (m)
E is the Young's modulus (elastic modulus or stiffness) of the material the fork is made from, (Pa or N/m^{2} or kg/(ms^{2}))
I is the second moment of area of the cross-section, (m^{4})
ρ is the density of the fork's material (kg/m^{3}), and
A is the cross-sectional area of the prongs (tines), (m^{2}).

The ratio k^{2} = I/A in the equation above, where k is the radius of gyration for the prongs, can be rewritten as r^{2}/4 if the prongs are cylindrical with radius r, and b^{2}/12 if the prongs have rectangular cross-section of width b along the direction of motion.

== Uses ==
Tuning forks have traditionally been used to tune musical instruments, though electronic tuners have largely replaced them. Forks can be driven electrically by placing electronic oscillator-driven electromagnets close to the prongs.

=== In musical instruments ===
A number of keyboard musical instruments use principles similar to tuning forks. The most popular of these is the Rhodes piano, in which hammers hit metal tines that vibrate in the magnetic field of a pickup, creating a signal that drives electric amplification. The earlier, un-amplified dulcitone, which used tuning forks directly, suffered from low volume.

=== In clocks and watches ===
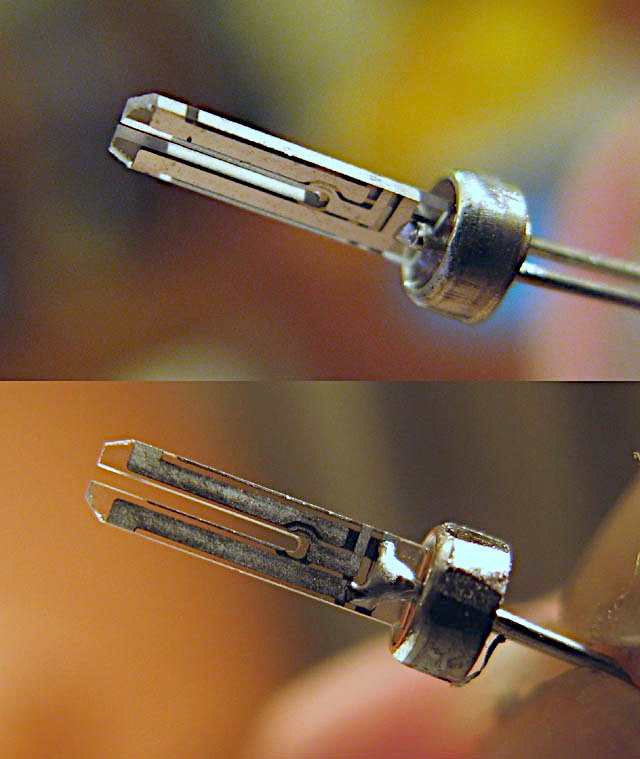
Quartz crystal resonator from a modern quartz watch, formed in the shape of a tuning fork. It vibrates at 32,768 Hz, in the ultrasonic range.

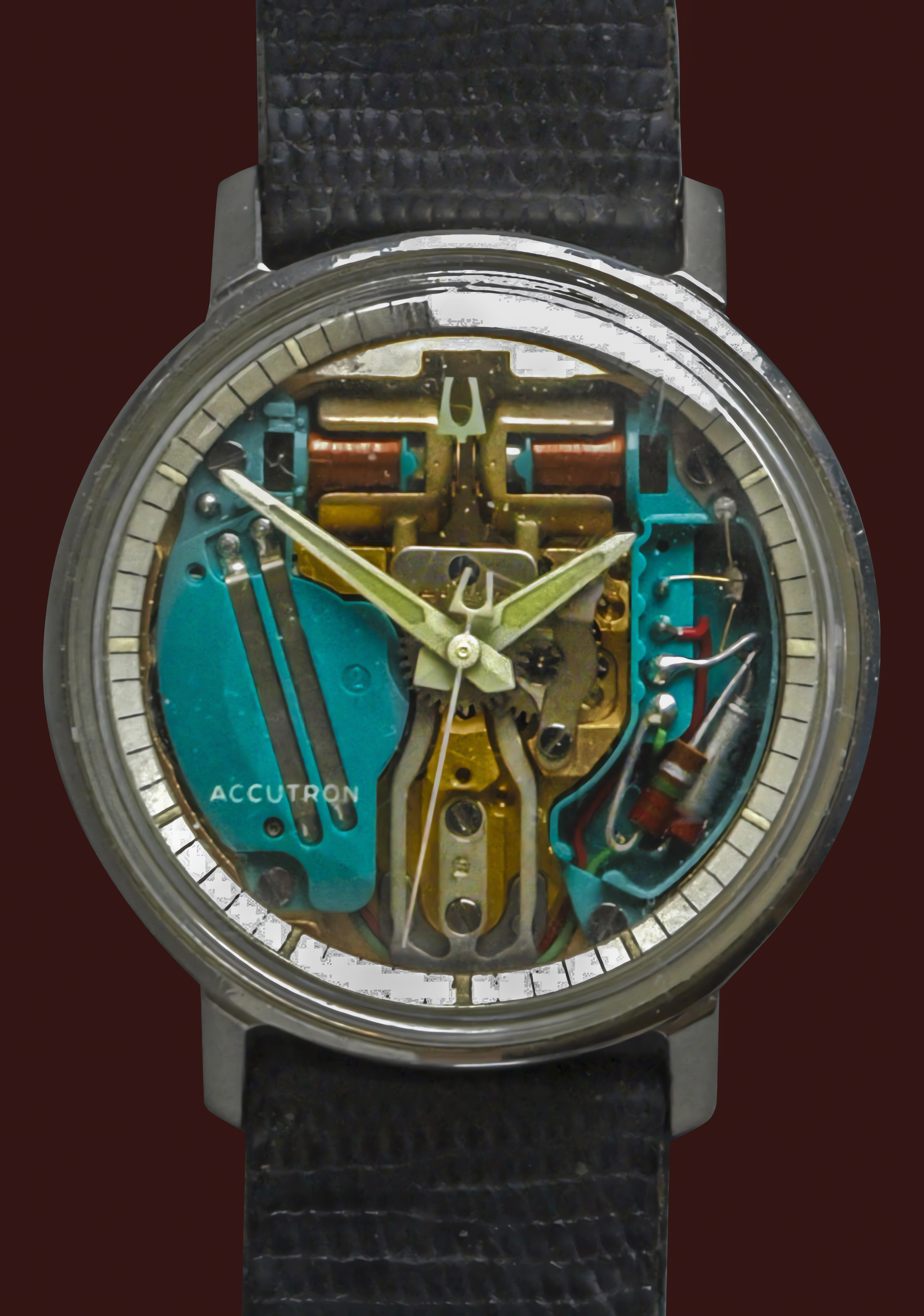
A Bulova Accutron watch from the 1960s, which uses a steel tuning fork (visible in center) vibrating at 360 Hz.

The quartz crystal that serves as the timekeeping element in modern quartz clocks and watches is in the form of a tiny tuning fork. It usually vibrates at a frequency of 32,768 Hz in the ultrasonic range (above the range of human hearing). It is made to vibrate by small oscillating voltages applied by an electronic oscillator circuit to metal electrodes plated on the surface of the crystal. Quartz is piezoelectric, so the voltage causes the tines to bend rapidly back and forth.

The Accutron, an electromechanical watch developed by Max Hetzel and manufactured by Bulova beginning in 1960, used a 360-hertz steel tuning fork as its timekeeper, powered by electromagnets attached to a battery-powered transistor oscillator circuit. The fork provided greater accuracy than conventional balance wheel watches. The humming sound of the tuning fork was audible when the watch was held to the ear.

=== Quartz tuning fork (QTF) as sensing device ===
Replacing the detector with a quartz tuning fork enables higher sensitivity, a more compact and lightweight design, and lower costs compared to conventional approaches.

- Accelerometers: A quartz tuning fork (QTF) functions as a high-precision acceleration-to-frequency transducer and displacement sensor in seismic and force-balance accelerometer systems. In high-resolution seismometers and accelerometers, a movable proof mass responds to ground motion or seismic waves. QMEMS (Quartz MEMS) accelerometers using tuning-fork transducers have been tested in active geophysical and volcanic regions for compact, low-power seismic and micro-seismicity monitoring.
- Biosensing & Chemical Sensors: When target particles, gas molecules, or thin layers (such as dopamine or polymers) bind or deposit onto the prongs, the effective mass changes, shifting the resonant frequency and dampening the Q-factor. Functionalized with specific coatings (such as polydopamine layers, MXenes, or antibodies) to detect heavy metals, volatile organic compounds (VOCs), DNA sequences, and pathogens like E. coli or viral markers.
- In gyroscopes: Doubled and H-type tuning forks are used for tactical-grade Vibrating Structure Gyroscopes and various types of microelectromechanical systems.
- Level sensors: Tuning fork forms the sensing part of vibrating point level sensors. The tuning fork is kept vibrating at its resonant frequency by a piezoelectric device. Upon coming in contact with solids, amplitude of oscillation goes down, the same is used as a switching parameter for detecting point level for solids. For liquids, the resonant frequency of tuning fork changes upon coming in contact with the liquids, change in frequency is used to detect level.
- Trace Gas Detection (QEPAS & LITES): Deployed in Quartz-Enhanced Photoacoustic Spectroscopy and Light-Induced Thermoelastic Spectroscopy, converting laser-induced acoustic waves or thermal expansion into sensitive gas concentration readouts (detecting CO, SO₂, NH₃, CH₄, H₂S, and H₂ at parts-per-billion levels). A quartz tuning fork with a high Q-factor functions as a narrow-band filter, making it possible to eliminate noise.
- Atomic Force Microscopy (AFM): Used in frequency-modulation AFM and qPlus sensors, where a tiny probe is glued to one prong to measure sub-nanometer forces and topography under ambient, vacuum, or liquid conditions.
- Photothermal spectroscopy: Unlike direct absorption spectroscopy (TDLAS) or classical photothermal setups, the QTF itself replaces expensive and wavelength-limited photodetectors.
- Scanning thermal microscopy: advanced scanning probe microscopy technique that combines scanning thermal microscopy (SThM) with a quartz tuning fork (QTF) force sensor. A micro-thermocouple or thermal probe is mounted onto one prong of a quartz tuning fork (commonly similar to those used in frequency-modulation AFM). Maps surface topography (via QTF force feedback) and thermal properties (via the micro-thermocouple) at the same time. Allows quantitative or qualitative mapping of local thermal conductivity, phase changes, or heat dissipation in nanostructures, semiconductor devices, and biological materials.

=== Medical and scientific uses ===
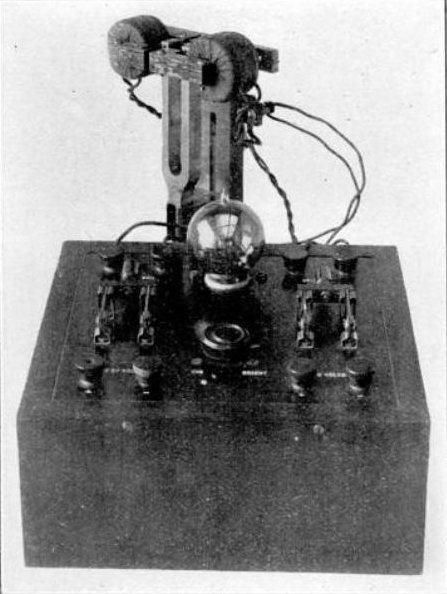
1 kHz tuning fork vacuum tube oscillator used by the U.S. National Bureau of Standards (now NIST) in 1927 as a frequency standard.

Alternatives to the common A=440 standard include philosophical or scientific pitch with standard pitch of C=512. According to Rayleigh, physicists and acoustic instrument makers used this pitch. The tuning fork John Shore gave to George Frideric Handel produces C=512.

Tuning forks, usually C512, are used by medical practitioners to assess a patient's hearing. This is most commonly done with two exams called the Weber test and Rinne test, respectively. Lower-pitched ones, usually at C128, are also used to check vibration sense as part of the examination of the peripheral nervous system.

Orthopedic surgeons have explored using a tuning fork (lowest frequency C=128) to assess injuries where bone fracture is suspected. They hold the end of the vibrating fork on the skin above the suspected fracture, progressively closer to the suspected fracture. If there is a fracture, the periosteum of the bone vibrates and fires nociceptors (pain receptors), causing a local sharp pain. This can indicate a fracture, which the practitioner refers for medical X-ray. The sharp pain of a local sprain can give a false positive. Established practice, however, requires an X-ray regardless, because it's better than missing a real fracture while wondering if a response means a sprain. A systematic review published in 2014 in BMJ Open suggests that this technique is not reliable or accurate enough for clinical use.

Quartz-Enhanced Photoacoustic Spectroscopy (QEPAS) is a high-sensitivity and selective optical sensing technique used for trace gas quantification and environmental monitoring.

Instead of a traditional microphone, QEPAS uses a quartz tuning fork (QTF)—similar to the ones found in electronic watches—as a high-Q acoustic transducer. A laser beam tuned to a specific absorption line of a target gas passes through a gas sample. When the laser intensity is modulated, the gas molecules absorb the light and release thermal energy via non-radiative relaxation, creating periodic acoustic pressure waves. The acoustic pressure waves force the prongs of the QTF to vibrate. Because quartz is piezoelectric, this mechanical deflection converts directly into an electrical voltage or current signal.

=== Non-medical and non-scientific uses ===
Tuning forks also play a role in several alternative therapy practices, such as sonopuncture and polarity therapy.

=== Radar gun calibration ===
A radar gun that measures the speed of cars or a ball in sports is usually calibrated with a tuning fork. Instead of the frequency, these forks are labeled with the calibration speed and radar band (e.g., X-band or K-band) they are calibrated for.

== See also ==
- Electronic tuner
- Pitch pipe
- Savart wheel
- Tonometer
