= Attention =

Psychological focus, perception and prioritising discrete information

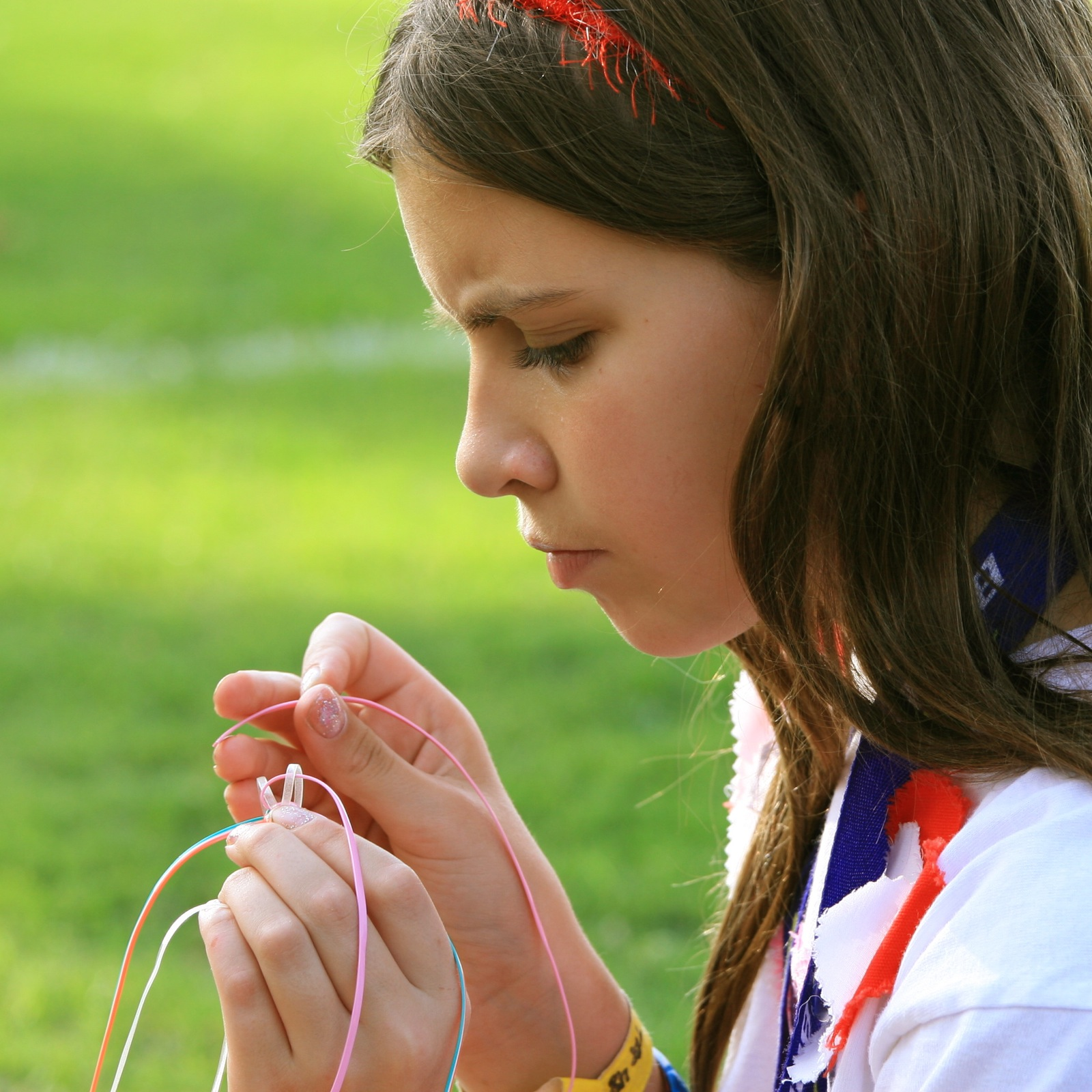
Focused attention

Attention is the concentration of awareness directed at some task or phenomenon while mostly excluding others.

Across disciplines, the nature of this directedness is conceptualized in different ways. In cognitive psychology, attention is often described as the allocation of limited cognitive processing resources to a subset of information, thoughts, or tasks. In neuropsychology, attention is understood as a set of mechanisms by which sensory cues and internal goals modulate neuronal tuning and orient behavioral and cognitive processes.

Attention is not a unitary phenomenon but an umbrella term for multiple related processes, including selective attention (prioritizing some stimuli over others), sustained attention (maintaining focus), divided attention (sharing resources across tasks), and orienting (shifting focus in space or time). These processes are supported by distributed neural networks in frontal, parietal, and subcortical regions and are closely linked to working memory, executive functions, and consciousness.

Patterns of attention also vary across cultures, especially in how individuals attend to context versus focal objects and how children are guided to manage attention in everyday activities.

== History ==
=== 16th century ===
John B. Watson called Juan Luis Vives the father of modern psychology. In his book De Anima et Vita, Vives argued that the more closely one attends to stimuli, the better they are retained in memory.

=== 17th century ===
Daniel E. Berlyne credited the first extended treatment of attention to Nicolas Malebranche, for whom attention is necessary "to keep our perceptions from being confused and imperfect".

Gottfried Wilhelm Leibniz introduced the concept of apperception, referring to "the process by which new experience is assimilated to and transformed by the residuum of past experience of an individual to form a new whole". Apperception is required for a perceived event to become a conscious event. Leibniz emphasized a reflexive, involuntary view of attention (exogenous orienting), while also recognizing voluntary, directed attention (endogenous orienting).

Johann Friedrich Herbart agreed with Leibniz's view of apperception but emphasized that new experiences must be tied to those already existing in the mind. Herbart was also among the first to stress the importance of applying mathematical modeling to the study of psychology.

=== 19th century ===
In the early 19th century, some theorists argued that people could not attend to more than one stimulus at a time. Later, William Hamilton likened attentional capacity to holding marbles: only a limited number can be held at once before they spill over. He proposed that more than one stimulus can be attended simultaneously. William Stanley Jevons expanded this view, suggesting that people can attend to up to four items at a time.

Wilhelm Wundt introduced the systematic study of attention into psychology. He examined mental processing speed by analogy with differences in astronomical measurements: astronomers differed in the times they recorded for star transits, leading to the idea of a personal equation. Wundt argued that such differences reflect the time required to shift voluntary attention from one stimulus to another, rather than mere "observation error".

Franciscus Donders used mental chronometry to study attention, making it a major topic of investigation. Donders and his students measured the time required to identify a stimulus and select a response, developing the subtractive method to estimate the duration of specific mental processes. He distinguished between simple, choice, and go/no-go reaction times.

Hermann von Helmholtz also contributed to attention research, showing that it is possible to focus on one stimulus while still perceiving others. For example, one can fixate on the letter "u" in the word "house" while still perceiving "h", "o", "s", and "e".

A major debate of this period concerned whether it was possible to attend to two things at once (split attention). William James, in The Principles of Psychology, provided an influential definition:

Everyone knows what attention is. It is the taking possession by the mind, in clear and vivid form, of one out of what seem several simultaneously possible objects or trains of thought. Focalization, concentration, of consciousness are of its essence. It implies withdrawal from some things in order to deal effectively with others, and is a condition which has a real opposite in the confused, dazed, scatterbrained state which in French is called distraction, and Zerstreutheit in German.

James distinguished between sensorial attention (to physically present stimuli) and intellectual attention (to imagined or remembered objects). He also differentiated immediate from derived attention and identified five major effects of attention: it influences perception, conception, discrimination, memory, and reaction time.

=== 20th century ===
==== 1910–1949 ====
During the first half of the 20th century, explicit research on attention declined as behaviorism became dominant, leading some, such as Ulric Neisser, to claim that "there was no research on attention". Nonetheless, important work was conducted. In 1927, A. T. Jersild published research on "mental set and shift," arguing that "the fact of mental set is primary in all conscious activity". He showed that it took longer to complete a mixed list (e.g., animals, books, car models, fruits) than a pure list (e.g., only animals), highlighting costs of task switching.

In 1931, C. W. Telford identified the psychological refractory period, the delay in responding to a second stimulus when it closely follows a first, reflecting a refractory phase in the nervous system.

In 1935, John Ridley Stroop developed what became known as the Stroop effect, demonstrating that task-irrelevant stimulus information (such as word meaning) can strongly interfere with performance.

==== 1950–1999 ====
In the 1950s, attention research was revitalized as psychology underwent the "cognitive revolution", shifting away from strict positivism and behaviorism to include unobservable mental processes as legitimate objects of study.

Lecture by cognitive scientist Marie Postma (Tilburg University) on focused attention

Modern experimental work began with investigations of the "cocktail party problem" by Colin Cherry in 1953. Cherry asked how people at a noisy party can attend to one conversation while ignoring others. He studied this through dichotic listening tasks, in which participants heard two simultaneous streams of speech through headphones and were asked to shadow (repeat) one stream while ignoring the other. These paradigms were extended by Donald Broadbent and others.

By the 1990s, psychologists increasingly used positron emission tomography (PET) and functional magnetic resonance imaging (fMRI) to study attention in the brain. Because this equipment was typically housed in hospitals, psychologists collaborated with neurologists. Psychologist Michael Posner and neurologist Marcus Raichle pioneered imaging studies of selective attention.

The adoption of neuroimaging, alongside long-standing techniques such as electroencephalography (EEG), led to extensive research on the neural basis of attention. A growing body of work identified a frontoparietal attention network implicated in the control of attention.

== Components ==
Attention is constrained by both the number of elements that can be processed and the duration of exposure. Experimental studies of attention began with Wundt's findings. He suggested the scope of attention limited to about 3–6 items. Decades of research on subitizing (the rapid apprehension of small numerosities) have supported Wundt's early findings regarding limits on the number of items that can be held in the focus of consciousness.

The scope of attention is related to cognitive development. As the mind grasps more details about an event, it also increases the number of reasonable combinations among those elements, potentially enhancing understanding. For example, three items in the focus of consciousness have six possible combinations (3 factorial), four have 24, and six have 720 (6 factorial). Empirical evidence suggests that the scope of attention in early development increases from about two items in the focal point at up to six months of age to five or more items by around five years.

=== Intentionality ===
A definition of a psychological construct shapes how it is studied. In scientific literature, attention sometimes overlaps with or is confused with intentionality, partly because of ambiguities in their linguistic definitions. Intentionality has been defined as "the power of minds to be about something: to represent or to stand for things, properties and states of affairs".

Although attention and intentionality may be described in similar terms, they are distinct constructs. Historically, experimental studies of attention began with Wundt's work using a 4 x 4 matrix of randomly chosen letters, which informed his theory of attention.

Wundt defined attention as "that psychical process, which is operative in the clear perception of the narrow region of the content of consciousness". His experiments suggested limits to the attentional threshold (about 3–6 letters seen during a 1/10-second exposure). He distinguished between the entrance of content into consciousness (apprehension) and its elevation into the focus of attention (apperception). Wundt's theory thus emphasized attention as an active, voluntary process unfolding over time.

In contrast, neuroscientific research suggests that intentionality can sometimes emerge rapidly and even unconsciously: neuronal correlates of an intentional act have been observed to precede conscious awareness of that intention (see also shared intentionality).

From this perspective, intentionality can be described as a mental state ("the mind being about something"), whereas attention is better understood dynamically as the process of elevating a subset of content into clear consciousness and sustaining it. The attention threshold may be viewed as the minimum time needed to clearly apprehend the intended content. Distinguishing these constructs is important for a precise scientific approach to attention.

=== Orienting ===
Orienting of attention refers to shifting focus across space, time, or modality. This can be driven by external (exogenous) or internal (endogenous) processes. External signals do not operate purely exogenously; they will capture attention and elicit eye movements primarily when they are behaviorally relevant to the observer.

Exogenous orienting is typically described as stimulus-driven and automatic. It is often triggered by sudden changes in the periphery and may produce reflexive saccades. Because exogenous cues usually appear in peripheral locations, they are referred to as peripheral cues. Exogenous orienting can occur even when observers know the cue is uninformative: the mere presence of the cue in a location influences responses to subsequent stimuli presented there.

Many studies have examined the impact of valid and invalid cues. Typically, brief valid peripheral cues speed responses, but when the interval between cue and target exceeds ~300 ms, this benefit reverses. Posner and Cohen (1984) termed this reversal inhibition of return, in which responses to validly cued locations become slower than to invalid locations.

Endogenous orienting is the intentional allocation of attention to a location or object based on goals or instructions. Endogenous cues are often presented centrally (e.g., arrows at fixation) and require interpretation and voluntary redirection of attention. These are therefore termed central cues.

Comparisons of exogenous and endogenous orienting have identified several differences:

- exogenous orienting is less affected by cognitive load than endogenous orienting;
- observers can ignore endogenous cues but not exogenous cues;
- exogenous cues typically have larger, more immediate effects; and
- expectations about cue validity influence endogenous orienting more strongly than exogenous orienting.

Both overlapping and distinct brain networks underlie these forms of orienting. A related distinction is between bottom-up (stimulus-driven) and top-down (goal-directed) attention. Bottom-up attention (often equated with exogenous attention) is driven by stimulus properties such as motion, brightness, or sudden onset and is associated with regions in the parietal lobe, temporal lobe, and brainstem. Experimental evidence supports the idea that the primary visual cortex (V1) constructs a bottom-up saliency map, relayed to the superior colliculus to guide attention and gaze shifts.

Top-down attention (also called goal-driven, endogenous, attentional control or executive attention) is mediated primarily by the frontal cortex and basal ganglia. As part of the executive functions, this system is closely related to working memory, conflict resolution, and inhibition.

=== Load ===
Some individuals can perform certain overlearned tasks with minimal conscious attention. For example, highly trained Morse code operators have been shown to copy messages accurately while engaging in a concurrent conversation. This reflects the development of automaticity through extensive practice: once a skill is overlearned beyond 100% accuracy, its execution can become largely autonomous and require fewer attentional resources.

Perceptual load theory proposes that attentional resources are limited and must be fully used. Under high perceptual load, fewer resources remain available for processing irrelevant stimuli, reducing distraction; under low load, more resources "spill over", increasing susceptibility to distraction.

In applied settings, such as education, measurement often emphasizes accuracy and reaction time (RT), which can obscure finer-grained distributions of temporal and spatial attention.

=== Neural correlates ===
Eric Knudsen identified four fundamental components of attention: (a) working memory, (b) competitive selection, (c) top-down sensitivity control, and (d) salience filters.

At different hierarchical levels, spatial maps enhance or inhibit activity in sensory areas and guide orienting behaviors such as eye movements:

- At higher levels, the frontal eye fields (FEF) and dorsolateral prefrontal cortex contain retinocentric spatial maps. Microstimulation in the FEF can induce saccades to specific locations, and subthreshold stimulation can enhance cortical responses to stimuli appearing there.
- The parietal cortex, including the lateral intraparietal area (LIP), contains saliency maps and is interconnected with both the FEF and sensory areas.
- Exogenous attentional guidance in humans and monkeys involves a bottom-up saliency map in V1, whereas in lower vertebrates, a comparable saliency map is more likely located in the superior colliculus (optic tectum).
- Highly salient stimuli can trigger automatic orienting mediated subcortically by the superior colliculi.
- At the neural network level, mechanisms such as lateral inhibition contribute to competitive selection.

Attention is associated with characteristic changes in EEG activity. Many animals, including humans, produce gamma waves (40–60 Hz) when focusing attention on particular objects or tasks.

Another influential framework, associated with Michael Posner, divides attention into three functional networks: alerting, orienting, and executive attention, which interact with one another.

- Alerting is the process of achieving and maintaining a state of readiness. It is associated with right frontal and parietal regions and modulated by norepinephrine.
- Orienting involves directing attention toward specific stimuli.
- Executive attention is recruited when there is conflict between competing responses or stimuli. It overlaps with the central executive in Baddeley's model of working memory and is associated with regions such as the anterior cingulate cortex.

== Types ==
Although there are many ways to classify attention, researchers often distinguish several core types:

- Selective attention – focusing on particular stimuli while ignoring others.
- Sustained attention – maintaining focus over extended periods.
- Divided attention – allocating resources across multiple tasks or stimuli.
- Alternating attention – shifting focus flexibly between tasks with different requirements.
- Spatial, feature-based, and object-based attention – prioritizing regions in space, particular features (e.g., color, motion), or whole objects.
- The following subsections highlight some specific forms of attention that have been emphasized in the literature.Researchers commonly classify attention into several core types:

=== 1. Focused Attention ===
Focused attention refers to the basic ability to respond to a specific stimulus (visual, auditory, or tactile). It represents the most fundamental level of attentional processing and is often described as orienting toward a stimulus.

=== 2. Sustained Attention (Vigilance) ===
Sustained attention is the ability to maintain consistent focus over prolonged periods of time, especially during tasks that require continuous monitoring.

- It is closely related to vigilance (long-term alertness).
- Performance typically declines over time, a phenomenon known as the vigilance decrement.

=== 3. Selective Attention ===
Selective attention is the ability to focus on relevant stimuli while ignoring competing or distracting information.

- It enables functioning in complex environments (e.g., the cocktail party effect).
- It reflects the brain's capacity limitations in processing multiple inputs.

=== 4. Alternating Attention ===
Alternating attention refers to the ability to shift focus between tasks or stimuli that require different cognitive demands.

- It involves mental flexibility and executive control.
- Example: switching between reading instructions and performing a task.

=== 5. Divided Attention ===
Divided attention is the ability to process or respond to multiple tasks or stimuli simultaneously, often referred to as multitasking.

- Research shows performance typically declines when attention is divided across tasks. Some people perform better on tasks requiring divided attention, such as people who tend to chronically spread their attention and incorporate the context.

=== Vigilant attention ===
Remaining focused on a non-arousing stimulus or uninteresting task for a sustained period is more difficult than attending to salient or interesting events and requires a specific form of attention called vigilant attention. Vigilant attention is the ability to sustain focus on a stimulus or task that may not inherently engage interest, while resisting distraction by other stimuli or internal thoughts.

=== Divided attention ===
Divided attention refers to attempts to allocate attention to multiple sources of information or tasks at the same time. In everyday language, this is often called multitasking. Research consistently shows that people make more errors and perform tasks more slowly when multitasking than when focusing on one task at a time.

Early research examined limits on learning and perception when people performed simultaneous tasks, such as reading while listening and writing something else, or listening to two different messages through each ear (dichotic listening). Later work examined divided attention in applied settings such as driving while tuning a radio or driving while talking on a phone.

Most contemporary research on multitasking investigates dual-task performance, often combining driving with secondary tasks such as texting, eating, or conversing. These studies show that driving performance deteriorates under dual-task conditions: drivers are more error-prone, brake harder and later, drift across lanes, and show reduced awareness of their surroundings.

There is little difference between speaking on hands-free versus hand-held phones, suggesting that the primary limitation is cognitive rather than motor. In contrast, passengers in the car can adapt their conversation to the demands of driving (e.g., pausing when traffic becomes complex), reducing interference.

Daniel Kahneman proposed a single-pool model of attentional resources: one central pool can be flexibly allocated across tasks, but total capacity is limited. Later work emphasized modality-specific and task-specific constraints, noting that interference is stronger when tasks rely on similar modalities (e.g., two verbal tasks).

David Navon and Daniel Gopher proposed a modality-based model of resources, while more recent dual-task research suggests that task demands themselves are critical.

Resource theory suggests that as tasks become more automatic, they consume fewer attentional resources, making divided performance more efficient. Other factors, including anxiety, arousal, task difficulty, and individual skills, also shape divided attention performance.

=== Simultaneous ===
Simultaneous attention refers to sustained attention to multiple events at the same time, rather than rapidly switching between them. This pattern has been documented in children in many Indigenous communities, who learn extensively by observing and participating in ongoing group activities.

In such contexts, children often coordinate their actions with others while monitoring multiple ongoing events, rather than dividing attention by alternation. This differs from multitasking as typically studied in Western settings, which often involves sequentially switching between tasks.

Simultaneous attention is reflected in the way Indigenous heritage toddlers and caregivers in San Pedro coordinate activities: they frequently engage in overlapping tasks and shared focus, whereas middle-class European-descent families in the U.S. more often move back and forth between events. Research suggests that children with close ties to Indigenous American communities are especially keen observers.

=== Social ===
Social attention concerns the allocation of processing resources in social contexts. Many studies have examined how attention is drawn to socially relevant stimuli such as faces, gaze direction, and body posture. A complementary line of research shows that self-related information (e.g., one's own face or name) automatically captures attention and is preferentially processed relative to others' information.

A synthetic view proposes that social attention spans a continuum from attending-to-self to attending-to-others. In one pole, individuals prioritize self-related information; in the other, they allocate attention to others to infer intentions and desires. Mechanisms supporting these polarities may interact and compete to form a social saliency map that guides behavior. Imbalances between attending-to-self and attending-to-others are implicated in conditions such as autism spectrum disorders and Williams syndrome.

== Models ==
=== Clinical ===
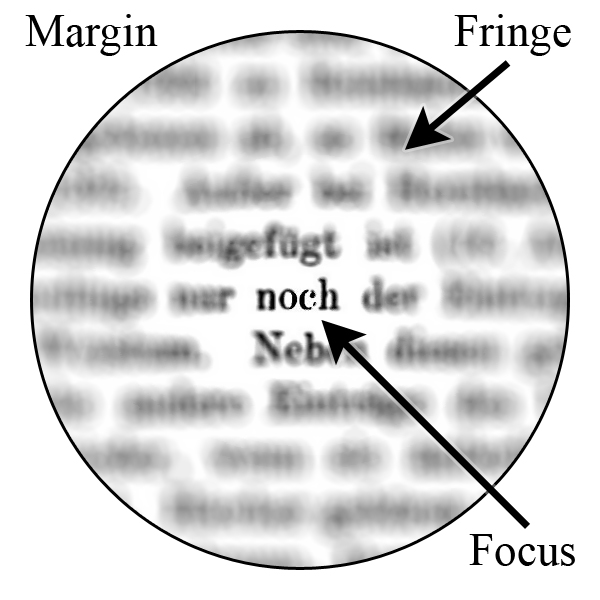

In cognitive psychology there are multiple models describing how attention operates, particularly in the visual domain. These models are often treated as metaphors that guide hypothesis generation and empirical testing. A common assumption is that visual attention involves at least two stages. In an initial parallel stage, information across the visual field is processed in a coarse manner. In a subsequent focused stage, attention is concentrated on a subset of items, which are processed in more detail, often in a serial fashion.

In the 20th century, the work of Lev Vygotsky and Alexander Luria contributed to neuropsychological models in which attention, memory, and activation form three co-active components of the working brain. In The Working Brain (1973) and Higher Cortical Functions in Man (1962), A. R. Luria presented a three-part model comprising (1) an attention system, (2) a mnestic (memory) system, and (3) a cortical activation system. Homskaya described these works as among Luria's major contributions to neuropsychology, integrating theoretical, clinical, and experimental perspectives.

Clinically, attention is often treated as a basic prerequisite for other cognitive functions. One widely used clinical model is that of Sohlberg and Mateer. Developed from work with patients recovering from brain damage and coma, this hierarchic model describes five levels of attentional functioning:

- Focused attention: responding discretely to specific sensory stimuli.
- Sustained attention (vigilance and concentration): maintaining consistent responses during continuous and repetitive activity.
- Selective attention: maintaining a behavioral or cognitive set in the presence of distracting or competing stimuli ("freedom from distractibility").
- Alternating attention: shifting focus and mental set between tasks with different cognitive demands.
- Divided attention: responding simultaneously to multiple tasks or task demands.

This model has been useful for evaluating attention across diverse pathologies, correlates well with everyday functioning, and informs rehabilitation programs such as Attention Process Training.

=== Filter ===
Broadbent's Filter Model of Attention proposed that sensory information is briefly held in a pre-attentive store, and a filter selects input based on simple physical characteristics (e.g., location, pitch). Selected information passes into a limited capacity processing system, while unattended inputs are blocked and not semantically processed. This implies that information in the unattended channel does not reach meaning-level analysis, and that shifting the filter between channels requires time.

Experiments by Gray and Wedderburn and subsequent work by Anne Treisman challenged this strict early filter model, leading to refinements. In Treisman's attenuation model, unattended inputs are not completely blocked; instead, they are attenuated and can be processed to some extent, especially if they are highly salient (e.g., a person's own name).

Deutsch and Deutsch later proposed a late selection model in which all inputs are processed semantically, and selection occurs at the point of response or conscious access. In this view, the attentional bottleneck occurs late, after semantic analysis.

=== Selection ===
Debates between early-selection and late-selection models centered on whether unattended information is processed semantically. Early-selection models (e.g., Broadbent, Treisman) posit that attention acts before full semantic analysis, whereas late-selection models (e.g., Deutsch & Deutsch) posit that semantic analysis occurs in parallel, with attention determining which representations reach awareness or guide behavior.

Nilli Lavie's perceptual load theory offered a synthesis: under high perceptual load, processing capacity is exhausted by relevant stimuli, producing early selection; under low load, excess capacity spills over to irrelevant stimuli, producing late-selection-like effects.

=== Spotlight ===
The spotlight model conceptualizes attention as a movable "beam" that enhances processing within a limited region of the visual field. The metaphor draws on William James's idea that attention has a focus, margin, and fringe. The focus is a region of high-resolution processing; the fringe is processed more coarsely; the margin marks the outer boundary.

=== Zoom-lens ===
The zoom-lens model, first introduced in 1986, extends the spotlight metaphor by allowing the size of the attended region to change. Like a camera lens, the attentional "zoom" can widen or narrow. Widening the focus distributes limited resources over a larger area, reducing processing efficiency; narrowing it concentrates resources and increases efficiency. The focus is thought to subtend a minimum of about 1° of visual angle.

== Theories ==
=== Attentional engagement ===
Attentional engagement theory proposes an initial pre-attentive, parallel phase in which the visual scene is segmented and analyzed, followed by selective attention that determines which information enters visual short-term memory. At the pre-attentive stage, structural descriptions of objects are created across multiple spatial scales; selective attention then "engages" with particular representations for further processing.

=== Feature integration ===
Feature integration theory is a theory of attention developed in 1980 by Anne Treisman and Garry Gelade that suggests that when perceiving a stimulus, features are "registered early, automatically, and in parallel, while objects are identified separately" and at a later stage in processing. The theory has been one of the most influential psychological models of human visual attention.

=== Perceptual load ===
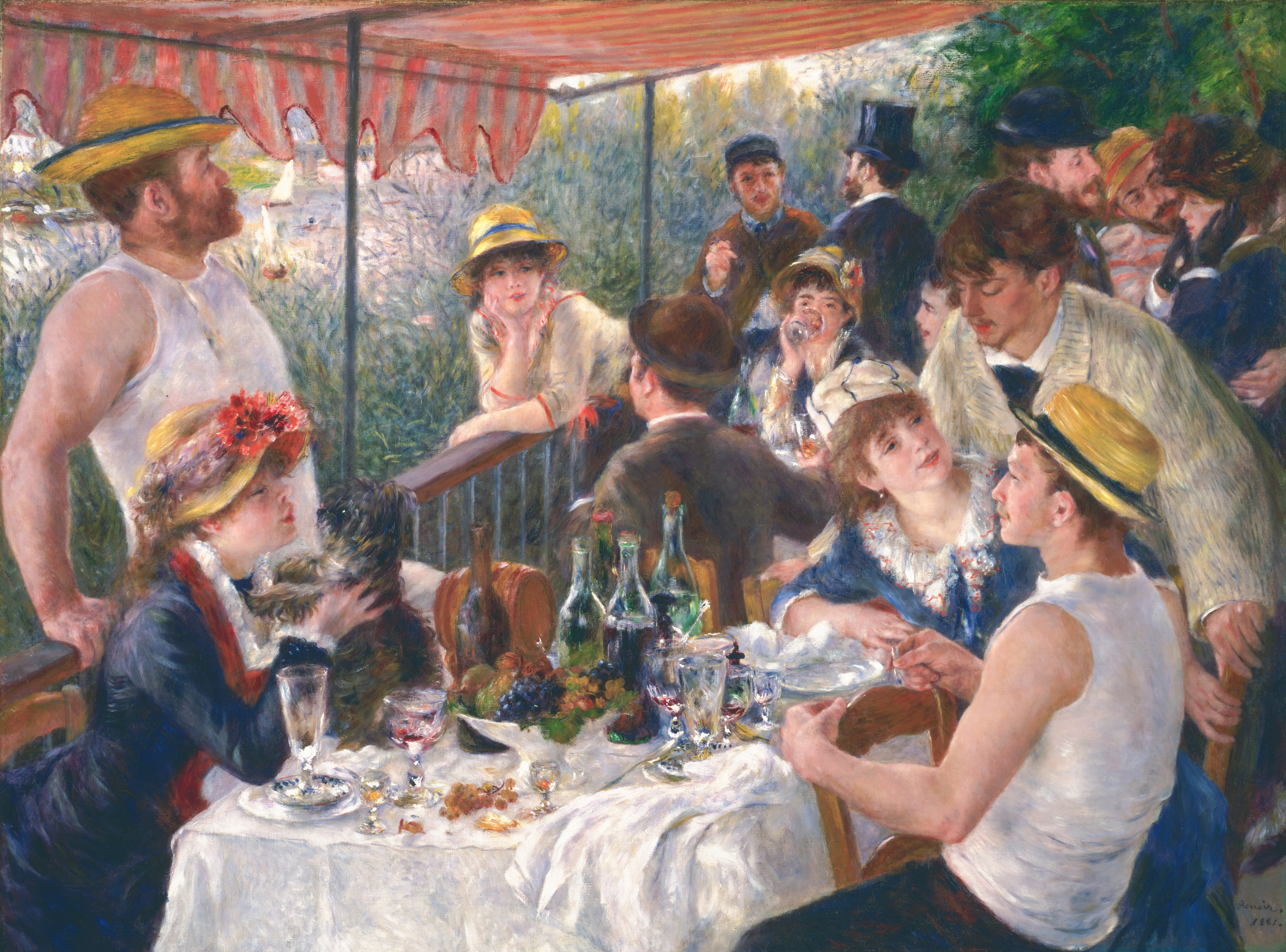

Perceptual load theory is a psychological theory of attention. It was presented by Nilli Lavie in the mid-nineties as a potential resolution to the early/late selection debate.

This debate relates to the "cocktail party problem": how do people at a cocktail party select the conversation they are listening to and ignore the others? The models of attention proposed prior to Lavie's theory differed in their proposals for the point in the information processing stream where the selection of target information occurs, leading to a heated debate about whether the selection occurs "early" or "late". There were also arguments about to what degree distracting stimuli are processed.

== Cultural variation ==
Children develop patterns of attention that reflect the cultural practices of their families, communities, and institutions.

In 1955, Jules Henry proposed that societal differences in sensitivity to multiple, simultaneous signals may foster different abilities to manage several levels of attention. He linked this hypothesis to ethnographic observations of communities in which children participate in complex social networks with multiple ongoing relationships.

In many Indigenous communities in the Americas, children predominantly learn by observing and pitching in to community activities. Studies suggest that keen observational attention is more common in such communities than in middle-class European-American contexts, where children often learn in settings designed specifically for them. In these Indigenous settings, children frequently monitor and coordinate multiple activities at once, illustrating culturally patterned forms of simultaneous and social attention.

== See also ==
- Action slip
- Alertness
- Attention deficit hyperactivity disorder
- Attention restoration theory
- Attention seeking
- Attention span
- Attention theft
- Attentional control
- Attentional shift
- Binding problem
- Change blindness
- Crossmodal attention
- Executive functions
- Flow (psychology)
- Focusing (psychotherapy)
- Hemispatial neglect
- Inattentional blindness
- Joint attention
- Mindfulness
- Ovsiankina effect
- Salience
- Split attention effect
- Tetris effect
- Vigilance
- Visual spatial attention
- Visual temporal attention
- Working memory
