= Inhibition of return =

Cue-response paradigm

Inhibition of return (IOR) refers to an orientation mechanism that briefly enhances (for approximately 100–300 milliseconds (ms)) the speed and accuracy with which an object is detected after the object is attended, but then impairs detection speed and accuracy (for approximately 500–3000 milliseconds). IOR is usually measured with a cue-response paradigm, in which a person presses a button when they detect a target stimulus following the presentation of a cue that indicates the location in which the target will appear. The cue can be exogenous (or peripheral), or endogenous. Inhibition of return results from oculomotor activation, regardless of whether it was produced by exogenous signals or endogenously. Although IOR occurs for both visual and auditory stimuli, IOR is greater for visual stimuli, and is studied more often than auditory stimuli.

== Description ==
IOR was first described in depth by Michael Posner and Yoav Cohen, who discovered that, contrary to their expectations, reaction times (RT) to detect objects appearing in previously cued locations were initially faster to validly cued location (known as the validity effect), but then after a period of around 300 ms, response times to a previously cued location were longer than to uncued locations. Specifically, IOR was described as "an inhibitory effect produced by a peripheral (or exogenous) cue or target."

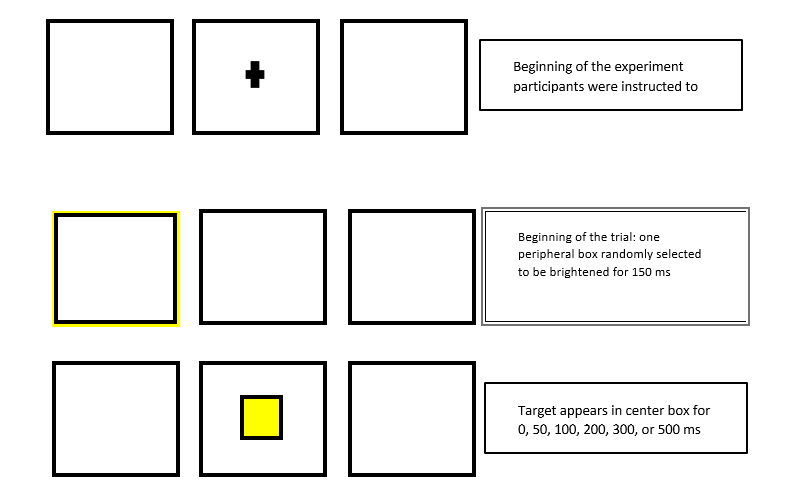
Example diagram of the process used in Posner's inhibition of return experiment.

In the experiment that demonstrated the paradigm, participants were instructed to fixate on a center box that was flanked with a box on its right and left sides. Each trial began with the brightening of the outline of one of the peripheral boxes that was randomly selected for 150 ms. During the trial, a target (a bright filled square) occurs at the center of box at either 0, 50, 100, 200, 300, or 500 ms after the initial brightening. The target is usually in the center box (with probability 60%), but it may also occur on either side (10% probability on each side). Catch trials in which no target is presented occur with probability of 20%. Participants had to respond to the target as quickly as possible by pressing a specified key. Participants' performance in RT on the cued side increased the first 150 ms; however, they then experienced inhibition of target RT on the cued side compared to the uncued side after 300 ms.

In order to explain the IOR mechanism, Anne Treisman and Gary Gelade's theory of visual search was expounded. This theory, known as the feature integration theory proposes that there are two types of visual searches: parallel searches and serial searches. According to Treisman and Gelade, attention is only required for serial searches. IOR is a mechanism that is specific for serial searches.

== Types of cues ==
One form of cue that can be implemented in an inhibition of return task are exogenous cues. Exogenous cues are stimuli that are produced in the environment surrounding. Because one's attention is shifted to the stimulus without much thought or effort, these cues are seen as a form of reflex that the person has low control over. Due to this cue's automatic nature and lack of effort, it uses very few of our attentive resources. This also causes our attention shift to be quicker for exogenous cues than for endogenous cues.

The cue type that directly contrast exogenous cues in many way is the endogenous cue. While exogenous cues are solely what stimuli are presented in one's surrounding environment, endogenous cues are based on the internal goals, beliefs, desires, and interpretation of the person. While an outside stimulus may be present, such as a stop sign, it is the individuals interpretations and knowledge of the sign that is the endogenous cue causing them to react in the manner they see fit.

Both cues play an equally important role of directing attention in Inhibition of Return, however the way in which they do so differs on a neurological level as well. Exogenous cues are automatic and are therefore considered to fall under the "bottom-up" approach regarding attention, while endogenous cues are under the person's control and are seen as "top-down". A 2007 experiment examined the way in which bottom-up and top-down processes affect attention during IOR. Electrodes were placed in both the parietal and frontal cortices as monkeys took part in a visual search task. In the task, the salience of the target object was manipulated. In the "pop out" condition, the target stimulus was different from the distractors in both color and shape, whereas in the "search" condition many of the distractors were the same as the target either in color or shape. Researchers found that top-down signals, coming from endogenous cues, are processed predominately in the frontal cortex and offer longer lasting effects, while exogenous bottom-up cues have faster occurring effects that appear in the lateral intraparietal area.

== Causes ==
Posner and Cohen proposed three explanations for inhibition:

1. inhibition results from having two alternative positions,
2. inhibition could result from moving attention away from a cued stimulus back to the fixation point, and
3. inhibition may occur because the efficiency in some part of the pathway from the cued location is reduced by the cuing.

An alternative explanation of IOR is that IOR occurs after attention has been disengaged from the cued stimulus, resulting in a delayed response back to that cued stimulus. This occurs because it inhibits an individual from reorienting back to a stimulus they previously attended to.

An early report suggested that IOR involves the midbrain superior colliculus. Support for this suggestion comes from work with a patient who suffered injury to one of the superior colliculi and experiments with the archer fish. Moreover, IOR is commonly triggered by an exogenous sensory signal presented in the visual periphery when the eyes are fixed. However, it has been suggested that activation of the midbrain oculomotor pathways might trigger IOR even under endogenous cueing. This conclusion has been questioned by researchers who have found in their studies that endogenous saccade activation is not efficient to produce IOR. Others believe that IOR is caused by both a delay in activation of attentional and motor processes.

== Functional significance ==
It has been suggested that IOR promotes exploration of new, previously unattended objects during visual search or foraging by preventing attention from returning to already-attended objects, providing an evolutionary advantage.

Klein hypothesized that in a parallel visual search, the difference between RTs at probe targets and empty locations should be less than in a serial visual search. He suggested that this occurs because in serial searches, "inhibitory tags" are left at each location that has been attended to. Thus, IOR is a mechanism that allows a person not to re-search in previously searched visual fields as a function of "inhibitory tags". This is known as the foraging facilitator proposal.

Researchers (including Klein himself) initially challenged the foraging facilitator proposal. Pratt and Abrams suggested that IOR was not a foraging assistant because inhibition only occurred at the most recently attended stimulus. Earlier, Klein and Taylor found that it could not be concluded that attention was inhibited in IOR because at that time, inhibition had not been examined utilizing non-spatial discrimination tasks. Additionally, questions arose after it had been difficult to replicate Klein's findings, however, similar finding were reported eventually.

Although researchers had proposed these challenges initially, more recent empirical studies have not only replicated Klein's findings, but have also rebutted the challenges posed initially.

Although recent studies have proposed the time effect as much lower, 20 milliseconds. This could mean IOR may have a much less profound effect. As with many phenomenon research for conclusivity ongoing.
