= Nilli Lavie =

British-Israeli psychologist and neuroscientist

- נילי לביא
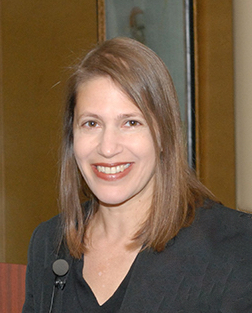
- Education: Tel Aviv University
- Known for: Perceptual Load Theory
- Awards: BPS Cognitive Section Award, EPS Mid-Career Award
- Scientific career
- Fields: Cognitive Neuroscience
- Workplaces: University College London (Institute of Cognitive Neuroscience)

Nilli Lavie (Hebrew: נילי לביא) FBA, is an academic, psychologist, and neuroscientist with British-Israeli dual nationality.

A Professor of Psychology and Brain Sciences and Director of the Attention and Cognitive Control laboratory at the University College London Institute of Cognitive Neuroscience, she is an elected Fellow of the British Academy, American Psychological Society, Royal Society of Biology, and British Psychological Society.

An honorary life member of the UK Experimental Psychology Society, she is known for providing a resolution to the 40-year debate on the role of attention in information processing and as the creator of the Perceptual load theory of attention, perception and cognitive control.

== Biography and education ==
Lavie earned BA Degrees in Psychology and in Philosophy from Tel Aviv University in 1987, and completed a PhD in Cognitive Psychology at Tel Aviv University in 1993.

In the mid-nineties, she received the Miller fellowship for postdoctoral training at UC Berkeley, which she held in Anne Treisman's laboratory. Following her postdoctoral training, she moved to the UK where she married the late Jon Driver and held her first faculty job at the MRC-Applied Psychology Unit (now the Cognition and Brain Sciences Unit) in Cambridge, UK. In late 1995 she joined UCL where she currently works and has written over 100 scientific papers.

== Awards and honours ==
She has received a British Psychological Society Cognitive Section Award for outstanding contribution to research in 2006. In 2011, she was selected as an "inspirational woman" in the WISE Campaign (Women into Science, Engineering and Construction). In 2012, she received the Mid-Career Award from the Experimental Psychology Society.

She was named an 'Academic Champion' at UCL (PALS division)(2012). She was also selected as an academic role model at UCL Faculty of Life Sciences (2012).

== Research ==
Lavie's research concerns the effects of information load on brain mechanisms, psychological functions (perception, conscious awareness, memory and emotion) and behaviour. This research is guided by the framework of her Load theory of attention and cognitive control. Lavie originally proposed the Load Theory in the mid-nineties to resolve the "Locus of Attentional Selection" debate.

Load Theory offered a new approach concerning the nature of information processing that reconciles the apparently contradicting views in this debate regarding the issue of capacity limits versus automaticity of processing. In Load Theory - perceptual information processing has limited capacity but processing proceeds automatically on all information within its capacity. The theory made an important contribution to the understanding of the impact of attention on information processing, visual perception and awareness. It explains how people use their working memory during task performance and the ways in which people can exert cognitive control over their perception, attention and behaviour.

== In the media ==
Lavie has made numerous media appearances in many TV science documentary programmes, interviews, and articles in British print and electronic media, including BBC One, BBC Two, BBC News, Channel 4, The Guardian, The Times, The Independent, New Scientist, The Daily Telegraph, as well as international media outlets.

== Personal life ==
Lavie was married to Jon Driver, who died in 2011. They had two sons.
