= Illusory conjunctions =

Psychological effects

Illusory conjunctions are psychological effects in which participants combine features of two objects into one object. There are visual illusory conjunctions, auditory illusory conjunctions, and illusory conjunctions produced by combinations of visual and tactile stimuli. Visual illusory conjunctions are thought to occur due to a lack of visual spatial attention, which depends on fixation and (amongst other things) the amount of time allotted to focus on an object. With a short span of time to interpret an object, blending of different aspects within a region of the visual field – like shapes and colors – can occasionally be skewed, which results in visual illusory conjunctions. For example, in a study designed by Anne Treisman and Schmidt, participants were required to view a visual presentation of numbers and shapes in different colors. Some shapes were larger than others but all shapes and numbers were evenly spaced and shown for just 200 ms (followed by a mask). When the participants were asked to recall the shapes they reported answers such as a small green triangle instead of a small green circle. If the space between the objects is smaller, illusory conjunctions occur more often.

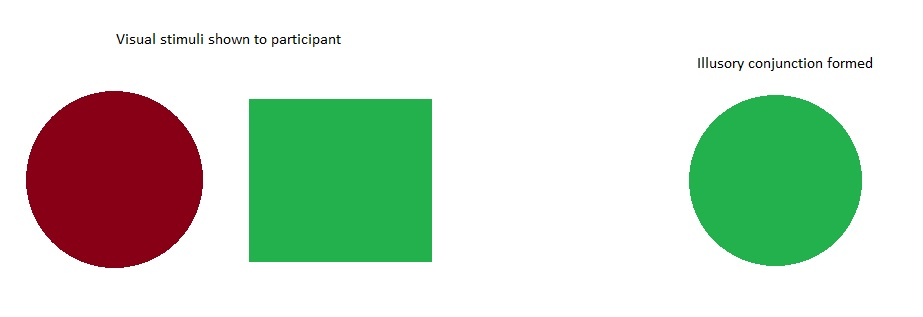
Example of an Illusory Conjunction between two different shapes of different colors forming an entirely new object

== Visual ==
Along with feature integration, the location of the perceived illusory object in vision is a combined result of the constituent objects' locations, but the similarity of the features is what increases the likelihood of an illusory conjunction. In order for an illusory conjunction to occur, the two objects that are not the focus of attention need to be within the visual field. The closer two objects are, the more likely the illusory conjunction is to occur. The increased likelihood of an illusory conjunction to occur when the objects are closer together may be due to a difference in processing compared with when the objects are more distant from each other. One theory supports that the decrease in illusory conjunctions with increased distance between objects is due to the use of bi-hemispheric input processing, making closer objects more likely to be conjoined because only one of the cerebral hemispheres sees and processes both objects that are involved in an illusory conjunction. Although proximity increases the likelihood of an illusory conjunction, illusory conjunctions formed between objects can occur even when the objects are distant, though still within the attentional field. When objects are outside of attention in order for an illusory conjunction to occur they must be adjacent to each other to combine features. Objects become more susceptible to illusory conjunction not only due to relation to each other, but also in relation to the density of objects in the attentional location. As the density of objects increases, there is more division of attention, which increases the possibility of forming of an illusory conjunction.

== Alternative theories ==
It has been suggested that research in support of illusory conjunctions is not adequate in terms of the methods used to analyze the data and that illusory conjunctions are actually confusions between target and nontarget objects. It has also been found in a few studies on visual illusory conjunctions that two objects that are not the focus of attention are also more likely to be combined when they are adjacent to each other. Although it would seem more common for objects to combine when they are not the focus of attention it is more likely for an illusory conjunction to occur when objects are the focus of attention. Visual illusory conjunctions can occur in long and brief exposure times along with the different levels of attention paid to the objects involved.

== Memory ==
Illusory conjunctions can also occur in memory. In vision, images can be combined through a lapse in memory of an image that is filled by physical stimuli. Illusory conjunctions often occur through memory errors because the situations in which illusory conjunctions happen involve multiple tasks or tasks that commonly divide a person's attention. While memory errors can aid in the formation of illusory conjunctions their formation is not dependent on memory errors. These memory errors can be caused by a multitude of objects in a space increases the amount of things to be processed and stored to memory increases. This increase in objects creates a prime situation for memory to lapse and form an illusory conjunction. Illusory conjunctions in short term auditory memory occur also. When a set of tones is played in a sequence, illusory conjunctions of 'what' and 'when' can occur. For example, if a sequence of tones begins with the note C, and later includes the note C#, and the note C# is repeated at the end of the sequence, there is a tendency for listeners to assume erroneously that this last note had also been the first note in the sequence. Illusory conjunctions of pitch and duration in tone sequences also occur.

== Auditory ==
Auditory illusory conjunctions occur either when two sounds are presented in different positions in space, but a single sound is heard, or when two different sounds are presented in different positions in space, but some of them are heard in the wrong spatial location. In the octave illusion, the listener is presented via earphones with a 20-second sequence consisting of two alternating tones that are an octave apart, and are repeatedly presented in alternation. The tones are 250 ms in duration. The same sequence is presented to the two ears, but when the right ear receives the high tone the left ear receives the low tone, and vice versa. Most listeners hear this sequence as a single tone that repeatedly changes both in pitch and in location. It has been suggested that time limitations contribute to this auditory illusory conjunction but see other explanations in terms of separate 'what' and 'where' pathways. In the scale illusion, the listener is presented via headphones with a scale with alternating tones switching from ear to ear. The scale is presented in both ascending and descending form, such that when a tone from the ascending scale is in the right ear, a tone from the descending scale is in the left ear. This gives rise to illusory conjunctions of pitch and location, such that all the higher tones are heard in one ear and all the lower tones in the other ear. Similar illusory conjunctions give rise to the chromatic illusion, the glissando illusion, and the cambiata illusion.

== Vision and touch ==
Illusory conjunctions can also occur between vision and touch. This happens when a seen object is attributed to textures that someone is feeling. This phenomenon is also more common when only one of the cerebral hemispheres is perceiving and processing the visual and tactile stimuli.

== See also ==
- Optical illusion
