= Jon Driver =

British neuroscientist (1962–2011)

Jon Driver FBA, FMedSci
- Driver
- Born: 4 July 1962; Halifax, West Yorkshire, United Kingdom
- Died: 28 November 2011 (aged 49); Hornsey, London, United Kingdom
- Education: University of Oxford
- Spouse: Nilli Lavie (2 children)
- Awards: Spearman Medal (1994); Fellow of the Academy of Medical Sciences (2005); Fellow of the British Academy (2008)
- Scientific career
- Fields: Psychology; Neuroscience
- Workplaces: University College London; Cambridge University; Birkbeck, University of London

Jonathon Stevens "Jon" Driver (4 July 1962 – 28 November 2011) was a psychologist and neuroscientist. He was a leading figure in the study of perception, selective attention and multisensory integration in the normal and damaged human brain.

== Early life ==
Driver was born in Halifax, West Yorkshire, on 4 July 1962, and was brought up in Kingston upon Hull. He was educated at Hymers College, where he played the cello in the school orchestra and also played bass guitar in bands in Hull. From his teens onwards, he was a devoted and expert fly fisherman, an activity which he later pursued in the chalk streams of southern England.

Driver studied experimental psychology at Queen's College, Oxford, graduating with a First Class degree in 1984. He then stayed on at Oxford for his DPhil, awarded in 1988, under the supervision of Alan Allport and Peter McLeod.

== Career ==
Following post-doctoral work in the US with Michael Posner at the University of Oregon, Driver took up a lectureship in the Department of Experimental Psychology at Cambridge University in 1990. In 1996 he was appointed to a professorship at Birkbeck College, and in 1998 he became Professor of Cognitive Neuroscience at University College London (UCL). From 2004 to 2009 he was Director of the UCL Institute of Cognitive Neuroscience, an interdisciplinary research centre that studies mental processes in the human brain. From 2009 Driver held a Royal Society Anniversary Research Professorship, which allowed him to concentrate on research. He was also a principal investigator at the Wellcome Trust Centre for Neuroimaging at UCL.

== Honours ==
In 2005 Driver was elected as a Fellow of the Academy of Medical Sciences; in 2006 as a member of Academia Europaea, the Academy of Europe; and in 2008 as a Fellow of the British Academy.

Driver received many prestigious awards during his career, including the Spearman Medal of the British Psychological Society, the Experimental Psychology Society (EPS) Prize, and the EPS Mid-Career Award. He was also awarded a Royal Society-Leverhulme Trust Senior Research Fellowship and a Royal Society Wolfson Research Merit Award. From 2009, Driver held a Royal Society Anniversary Research Professorship (one of only six scientists selected across all disciplines).

== Research ==
Driver's research focused on selective attention, spatial cognition and multisensory integration (the interplay between our different senses) in the healthy and damaged human brain (e.g. in hemispatial neglect). He used an integrative methodological approach combining psychophysical, neuropsychological, neuroimaging and TMS, and was one of the first to perform concurrent TMS-fMRI to study how dynamic interactions between brain regions can support cognitive functions. His work revealed differential influences on face processing from attention and emotion in the human brain, with the amygdala response to threat-related expressions unaffected by a manipulation of attention that strongly modulates the response to faces in fusiform gyri. He also probed the neural mechanisms of crossmodal links in attention - such as sudden touch on one hand improving vision near that hand - showing that these can be mediated by back-projections from multimodal parietal areas to unimodal visual cortex.

His research was funded by the Medical Research Council, the Wellcome Trust, the Biotechnology and Biological Sciences Research Council, the Economic and Social Research Council, the James S. McDonnell Foundation, and The Stroke Association. Driver authored over 200 scientific publications, and his work has been cited over 50,000 times. He played an instrumental role as a member of the team leading UCL's successful bid for the Sainsbury-Wellcome Centre.

== Personal life ==
In 1995, at Cambridge, Driver married Nilli Lavie. They had two sons.

Driver took his own life in Hornsey on 28 November 2011, aged 49, ten months after shattering his knee in a motorcycle accident which left him in debilitating chronic pain. He was survived by his wife and sons.

== Jon Driver Prize ==
To honour the memory of Jon Driver, a group of friends and colleagues established the Jon Driver Prize. Reflecting Jon Driver’s commitment to mentorship and his seminal contribution to promoting neuroscience at UCL, the prize is awarded competitively every year to recognise high-quality research of students completing their PhD in the field of neuroscience at UCL.

== Selected publications ==
- Driver, J.; Baylis, G.C.; Rafal, R.D. (1992). "Preserved figure-ground segregation and symmetry perception in visual neglect". Nature. 360 (6399): 73–5. Bibcode:1992Natur.360...73D. doi:10.1038/360073a0. PMID 1436078. S2CID 4345264.
- Driver, J. (1996). "Enhancement of selective listening by illusory mislocation of speech sounds due to lip-reading". Nature. 381 (6577): 66–68. Bibcode:1996Natur.381...66D. doi:10.1038/381066a0. PMID 8609989. S2CID 4319029.
- Driver, J.; Mattingley, J.B. (1998). "Parietal neglect and visual awareness". Nature Neuroscience. 1 (1): 17–22. doi:10.1038/217. PMID 10195103. S2CID 4236157.
- Macaluso, E.; Frith, C.D.; Driver, J. (2000). "Modulation of Human Visual Cortex by Crossmodal Spatial Attention". Science. 289 (5482): 1206–8. Bibcode:2000Sci...289.1206M. doi:10.1126/science.289.5482.1206. PMID 10947990.
- Vuilleumier, Patrik; Armony, Jorge; Driver, Jon; Dolan, Raymond (2001). "Effects of Attention and Emotion on Face Processing in the Human Brain: An Event-Related fMRI Study". Neuron. 30 (3): 829–41. doi:10.1016/s0896-6273(01)00328-2. hdl:21.11116/0000-0001-9FA0-7. PMID 11430815. S2CID 12004324..
- Spence, C.; Driver, J. (2004). Crossmodal space and crossmodal attention. USA: Oxford University Press. ISBN 9780198524861.
- Ruff, C. C.; Blankenburg, F.; Bjoertomt, O.; Bestmann, S.; Freeman, E.; Haynes, J. D.; Rees, G.; Josephs, O.; Deichmann, R.; Driver, J. (2006). "Concurrent TMS-fMRI and Psychophysics Reveal Frontal Influences on Human Retinotopic Visual Cortex". Current Biology. 16 (15): 1479–1488. Bibcode:2006CBio...16.1479R. doi:10.1016/j.cub.2006.06.057. hdl:11858/00-001M-0000-0010-A575-0. PMID 16890523. S2CID 12107993.
- Driver, J.; Blankenburg, F.; Bestmann, S.; Ruff, C. C. (2010). "New approaches to the study of human brain networks underlying spatial attention and related processes" (PDF). Experimental Brain Research. 206 (2): 153–62. doi:10.1007/s00221-010-2205-7. PMC 2940032. PMID 20354681.
