= Perceptual load theory =

Psychological theory of attention

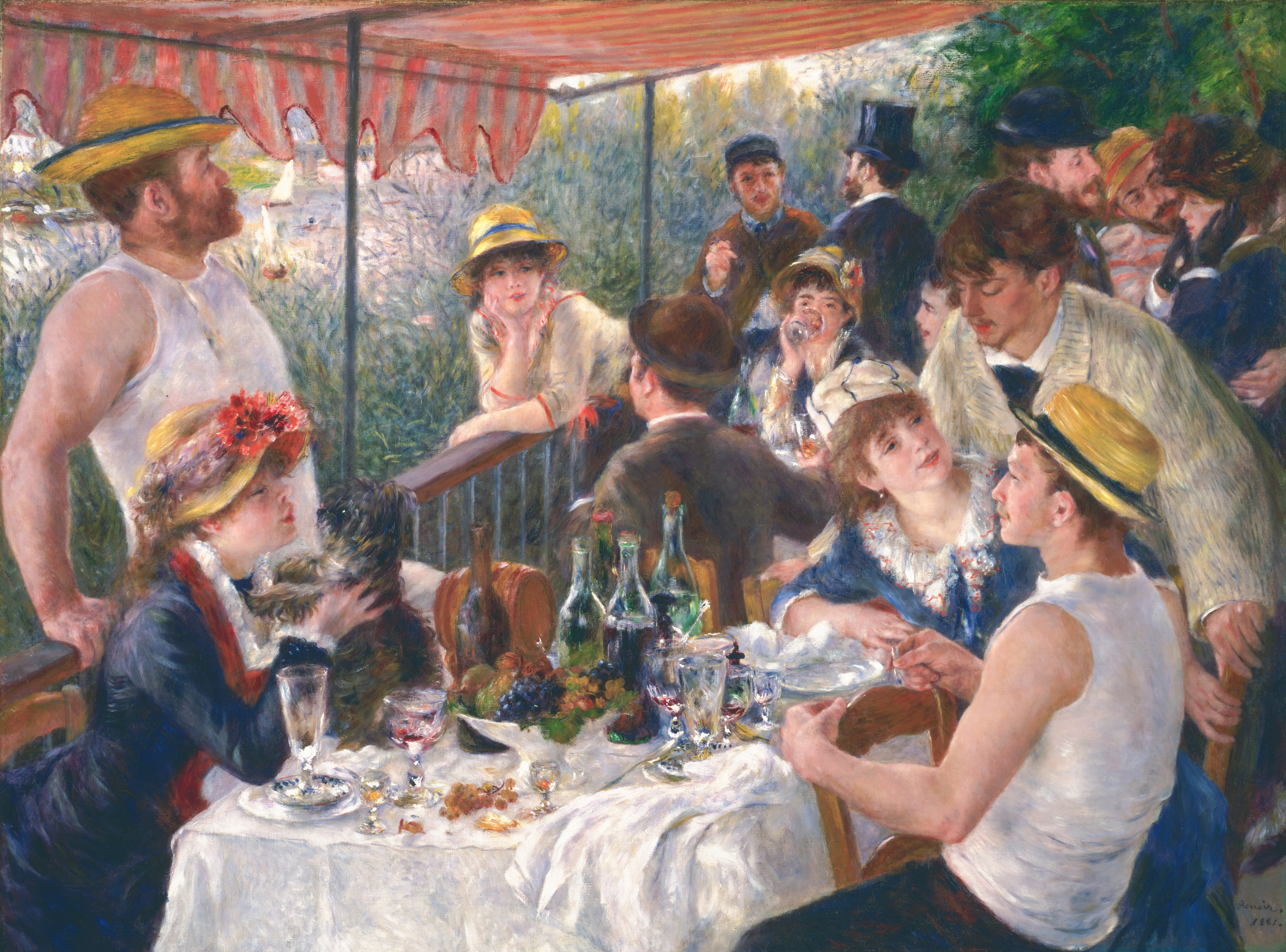

Perceptual load theory is a psychological theory of attention. It was presented by Nilli Lavie in the mid-nineties as a potential resolution to the early/late selection debate.

This debate relates to the "cocktail party problem": how do people at a cocktail party select the conversation they are listening to and ignore the others? The models of attention proposed prior to Lavie's theory differed in their proposals for the point in the information processing stream where the selection of target information occurs, leading to a heated debate about whether the selection occurs "early" or "late". There were also arguments about to what degree distracting stimuli are processed.

== History ==
Modern research on attention began when Colin Cherry articulated the "cocktail party problem" in 1953: at a cocktail party how do people select the conversation that they are listening to and ignore the rest? Cherry performed experiments in which subjects would use a set of headphones to listen to two streams of words in different ears and selectively attend to one stream; they would then be asked about the content of the other stream. These experiments showed that subjects take in very little of the information supplied in the stream they are not focusing on.

Donald Broadbent used results of this kind of experiment to develop his filter model of attention, which suggests that humans process information with limited capacity, and therefore information must be selected by a sensory filter soon after it is received. All information in the filter that is not directly attended to will decay. In contrast, Deutsch and Deutsch argued that this filtering of irrelevant stimuli occurs in the late stages of processing: all of the information is processed on a sensory level, but the semantic content of the message in the unattended ear cannot access the consciousness.

== Description ==
Lavie attempted to resolve the early/late selection debate by arguing that both early and late selection occur depending on the stimulus presented. She introduced the concept of perceptual load, referring to the complexity of the physical stimuli, particularly the distractor stimuli. For example, searching for a lone square in a scene among surrounding circles involves relatively low perceptual load; whereas a square surrounded by many different shapes would require higher perceptual load to locate.

A "hugely influential" theory regarding selective attention is the perceptual load theory, which states that there are two mechanisms that affect attention: cognitive and perceptual. The perceptual mechanism considers the subject's ability to perceive or ignore stimuli, both task-related and non task-related. Studies show that if there are many stimuli present (especially if they are task-related), it is much easier to ignore the non-task related stimuli, but if there are few stimuli the mind will perceive the irrelevant stimuli as well as the relevant. The cognitive mechanism refers to the actual processing of the stimuli. Studies regarding this showed that the ability to process stimuli decreased with age, meaning that younger people were able to perceive more stimuli and fully process them, but were likely to process both relevant and irrelevant information, while older people could process fewer stimuli, but usually processed only relevant information.

=== Key assumptions ===
Perceptual load theory makes three main assumptions:

- Attentional resources are limited in capacity;
- Task-relevant stimuli are processed before task-irrelevant stimuli;
- All of the attentional resources must be used.

Thus, if the task-relevant stimulus uses all the attentional resources, none of the task-irrelevant stimuli will be processed. In high-load tasks the target's attentional resources are depleted faster than in a low-load task. The target will therefore be selected sooner and the distractors will be quickly filtered out. In a low-load task, more of the distractors will be processed because the attentional resources have not been exhausted, and the filtering step will occur later. In a low-load situation the distractors will be perceived, potentially causing an interference. Additionally, in some cases load conditions can be insignificant and the processing of task-irrelevant stimuli can be attributed to attentional filters.

In this model, selection occurs both in the early stages of processing (high-load condition) and in the late stages (low-load condition).

== Criticism ==
=== Distractor salience ===
An alternative theory proposed to explain Lavie's results is distractor salience. This theory argues that the salience, or prominence, of a distractor is the primary factor in causing distraction, rather than the overall load. Lavie's research showed that a high perceptual load will not ignore a distractor if the interruption has a face; however, when researchers Chunhong He and Antao Chen examined distractors, they found that a while a high perceptual load will overlook an unfamiliar interference, it will not remove a familiar distractor, regardless of whether it has a face or not. When attempting to identify features in a distractor, features such as depth, dimension, and size have no effect on perceptual load.

=== Attentional zoom ===
A second alternative explanation for Lavie's results is attentional zoom, which suggests that the apparent difference between high-load and low-load conditions is not due to the overall load, but instead to the degree of localization of the participant's field of attention. Attentional zoom theory proposes that participants can process distractors that are within their attentional focus. When an individual is induced to have a small attentional focus and the distractors fall outside of the focus, minimal processing of the distractors and interference is seen. Studies done on the relationship between attention control and perceptual load show that while load-level can be influential, it is merely one of many factors to consider when examining attention control and that the physical location of the interference is more impactful to attentional zoom than load conditions. A larger attentional focus that includes distractors leads to a higher level of interference. On average, those with high perceptual loads have greater attentional assets than those with low-loads.

=== Locus versus efficiency ===
Lavie's PhD supervisor, Yehoshua Tsal, the senior author on the original paper, published a critical review of the perceptual load theory in 2013 with Hanna Benoni. The review argues that perceptual load theory has been misconstrued as a hybrid solution to the early selection versus late selection debate, and that it is instead an early selection model: selection occurs because attention is necessary for semantic processing, and the difference between high-load and low-load conditions is a result of the fact that selection is efficient in high-load conditions but inefficient in low-load conditions.

Benoni and Tsal argue that perceptual load theory deserves recognition not for proposing a hybrid model of attention, but for shifting the focus from the locus of attentional selection to the more important question of the efficiency of attentional selection. It is undecided amongst scholars if the nature of perceptual load has never been precisely defined, leading to circularity in characterizing load and in analyzing the results of differences in load.

== See also ==
- Attention
- Attentional control
- Inattentional blindness
- Mindfulness
- Pre-attentive processing
