= Edna Butfield =

British speech and language therapist

Edna Butfield MBE FRCSLT
- Occupation: Speech Therapist

Academic work
- Sub-discipline: Aphasia; Dysphasia
- Institutions: RCSLT; University College London

Edna Butfield MBE FRCSLT was a British speech and language therapist and the Principal of West End Hospital Speech Therapy Training School, London (latterly part of University College London). She was elected a Fellow of the Royal College of Speech and Language Therapists (RCSLT) in 1950 and awarded the annual Honours of the RCSLT in 1982. In 1969, she was made a MBE in the 1969 New Year Honours list.

== Life ==
Butfield conducted an “historically important” study of the effectiveness of aphasia treatment, published in 1946. The study, conducted with Oliver Zangwill in Edinburgh, assessed 70 cases of aphasia, and attempted to distinguish between treatment effects and spontaneous recovery. It has been described by Howard and Hatfield as “the first published attempt to evaluate the efficacy of therapy properly, and to assess also the significance of specific factors, such as the form of aphasia and its aetiology’.

According to Andrew Burchell, Butfield was a key figure in the development of the College of Speech Therapists (CST, later the Royal College of Speech and Language Therapists). Butfield had led County Armagh to do the first full school population survey of speech disorders in Ireland. The survey was conducted in 1949–50, and compared to a similar survey in East Ham in London in 1946–47. The final report found double the number of speech defects in Irish children, which Butfield attributed to children living in “remote areas where vocabulary is extremely limited, and the speech pattern of the family primitive”.

In the 1970s, Butfield introduced philanthropist Sir Sigmund Sternberg to the work of the Royal College of Speech Therapists, after which he was an active supporter of the college.

== Recognition ==
Butfield was elected a Fellow of the Royal College of Speech and Language Therapists in 1950 and awarded the annual Honours of the RCSLT in 1982. In 1969, she was made a MBE in the 1969 New Year Honours list.

== Publications ==
- E. BUTFIELD; O. L. ZANGWILL (1946). "Re-education in aphasia; a review of 70 cases" (PDF). Journal of Neurology, Neurosurgery and Psychiatry. 9 (2): 75–79. doi:10.1136/jnnp.9.2.75. PMC 497087. PMID 20274398. Wikidata Q37146770.
- Butfield, E., 1958. "Rehabilitation of the dysphasic patient". Speech Pathology and Therapy, 1, 9–17
- Butfield, E. 1960. "Acquired receptive dysphasia". Speech Pathology and Therapy, 3, 8–12.
- Butfield E (1966). "Treatment of acquired speech and language disorders associated with hemiplegia". Physiotherapy. 52 (10): 350–353. PMID 6009468. Wikidata Q72179565.
- BUTFIELD E (1962). "'Stroke' and speech recovery". Nursing Times. 58: 1012–1014. PMID 13875177. Wikidata Q79360586.
- E. Butfield (1972). "Speech Therapy for Hemiplegics". The BMJ. 1 (5799): 569–569. PMC 1787429. Wikidata Q93651567.
