= Orthography =

Set of conventions for written language

An orthography is a set of conventions for writing a language, including norms of spelling, punctuation, word boundaries, capitalization, hyphenation, and emphasis.

Most national and international languages have an established writing system that has undergone substantial standardization, thus exhibiting less dialect variation than the spoken language. These processes can fossilize pronunciation patterns that are no longer routinely observed in speech (e.g. would and should); they can also reflect deliberate efforts to introduce variability for the sake of national identity, as seen in Noah Webster's efforts to introduce easily noticeable differences between American and British spelling (e.g. honor and honour).

Orthographic norms develop through social and political influence at various levels, such as encounters with print in education, the workplace, and the state. Some nations have established language academies in an attempt to regulate aspects of the national language, including its orthography—such as the Académie Française in France and the Royal Spanish Academy in Spain. No such authority exists for most languages, including English. Some non-state organizations, such as newspapers of record and academic journals, choose greater orthographic homogeneity by enforcing a particular style guide or spelling standard such as Oxford spelling.

== Terminology ==
The English word orthography is first attested in the 15th century, ultimately from Ancient Greek: ὀρθός (orthós 'correct') and γράφειν (gráphein 'to write').

Orthography in phonetic writing systems is often concerned with matters of spelling, i.e. the correspondence between written graphemes and the phonemes found in speech. Other elements that may be considered part of orthography include hyphenation, capitalization, word boundaries, emphasis, and punctuation. Thus, orthography describes or defines the symbols used in writing, and the conventions that regulate their use.

Most natural languages developed as oral languages and writing systems have usually been crafted or adapted as ways of representing the spoken language. The rules for doing this tend to become standardized for a given language, leading to the development of an orthography that is generally considered "correct". In linguistics, orthography often refers to any method of writing a language without judgement as to right and wrong, with a scientific understanding that orthographic standardization exists on a spectrum of strength of convention. The original sense of the word, though, implies a dichotomy of correct and incorrect, and the word is still most often used to refer specifically to a standardized prescriptive manner of writing. A distinction is made between emic and etic viewpoints, with the emic approach taking account of perceptions of correctness among language users, and the etic approach being purely descriptive, considering only the empirical qualities of any system as used.

== Units and notation ==
The smallest orthographic units, such as letters of an alphabet, are conceptualized as graphemes. These are a type of abstraction, analogous to the phonemes of spoken languages; different physical forms of written symbols are considered to represent the same grapheme if the differences between them are not significant for meaning. Thus, a grapheme can be regarded as an abstraction of a collection of glyphs that are all functionally equivalent. For example, in written English (or other languages using the Latin alphabet), there are two different physical representations (glyphs) of the lowercase Latin letter a: ⟨a⟩ and ⟨ɑ⟩. Since the substitution of either of them for the other cannot change the meaning of a word, they are considered to be allographs of the same grapheme, which can be written |a|. The italic and boldface forms are also allographic.

Graphemes or sequences of them are sometimes placed between angle brackets, as in |b| or |back|. This distinguishes them from phonemic transcription, which is placed between slashes (/b/, /bæk/), and from phonetic transcription, which is placed between square brackets ([b], [bæk]).

== Types ==
The writing systems on which orthographies are based can be divided into a number of types, depending on what type of unit each symbol serves to represent. The principal types are logographic (with symbols representing words or morphemes), syllabic (with symbols representing syllables), and alphabetic (with symbols roughly representing phonemes). Many writing systems combine features of more than one of these types, and a number of detailed classifications have been proposed. Japanese is an example of a writing system that can be written using a combination of logographic kanji characters and syllabic hiragana and katakana characters; as with many non-alphabetic languages, alphabetic romaji characters may also be used as needed.

== Correspondence with pronunciation ==
Orthographies that use alphabets and syllabaries are based on the principle that written graphemes correspond to units of sound of the spoken language: phonemes in the former case, and syllables in the latter. In virtually all cases, this correspondence is not exact. Different languages' orthographies offer different degrees of correspondence between spelling and pronunciation. An orthography in which the correspondences between spelling and pronunciation are highly complex or inconsistent is called a deep orthography (or less formally, the language is said to have irregular spelling). An orthography with relatively simple, consistent correspondences (i.e. more bijective, or one-to-one) between spelling and pronunciation is called shallow (and the language has regular spelling).

The Navajo alphabet is a deep orthography. The Navajo language is a complex language system that relies on relatively subtle phonetics, including distinct tones and nasalization. The script likewise exhibits complexities representing the language, which presents challenges for people trying to acquire literacy.

Spanish is an alphabet with shallow orthography; there is clear one-to-one correspondence between phonemes and graphemes. Another is the Hawaiian alphabet, which only includes eight consonant letters and five vowel letters, for a total of thirteen. This allows literacy to be acquired quickly compared to deeper orthographies.

=== Developing literacy ===
According to studies, children learn to read and write more quickly in shallow orthographies, such as Spanish, compared to deeper orthographies, like English. Orthographic mapping is the process of associating phonemes with graphemes. By establishing these strong connections, children can easily decode unfamiliar words with what they already know. Orthographic mapping also helps with vocabulary development and reading fluency. Researchers have also argued that deeper orthographies make it challenging for individuals with dyslexia to learn.

=== Defective orthographies ===
An orthography based on a correspondence to phonemes may sometimes lack characters to represent all the phonemic distinctions in the language. This is called a defective orthography. An example in English is the lack of any indication of stress. Another is the digraph |th|, which represents two different phonemes (as in then and thin) and replaced the old letters |ð| and |þ|. A more systematic example is that of abjads like the Arabic and Hebrew alphabets, in which the short vowels are normally left unwritten and must be inferred by the reader.

When an alphabet is borrowed from its original language for use with a new language—as has been done with the Latin alphabet for many languages, or Japanese katakana for non-Japanese words—it often proves defective in representing the new language's phonemes. Sometimes this problem is addressed by the use of such devices as digraphs (such as |sh| and |ch| in English, where pairs of letters represent single sounds), diacritics (like the caron on the letters |š| and |č|, which represent those same sounds in Czech), or the addition of completely new symbols (as some languages have introduced the letter |w| to the Latin alphabet) or of symbols from another alphabet, such as the rune |þ| in Icelandic.

After the classical period, Greek developed a lowercase letter system with diacritics to enable foreigners to learn pronunciation and grammatical features. As pronunciation of letters changed over time, the diacritics were reduced to representing the stressed syllable. In Modern Greek typesetting, this system has been simplified to have only a single accent to indicate which syllable is stressed.

== See also ==
- Cursive – Style of penmanship
- Keyboard layout – Arrangement of keys on a typographic keyboard
- Lateral masking – Problem in visual perception
- List of language disorders
- Palaeography – Study of historical handwriting and manuscripts
- Penmanship – Technique of writing with the hand
- Prescription and description – Distinction between what is and what ought to be
- Spelling reform – Changing of the fundamental parts of orthography of a language
