= Wendy Kellogg =

American psychologist

Wendy A. Kellogg is an American psychologist and computer scientist who specializes in human-computer interaction. She founded the Social Computing Group at the Thomas J. Watson Research Center of IBM Research, and helped found the field of social computing.

Kellogg earned her Ph.D. in cognitive psychology from the University of Oregon under the supervision of Michael Posner. In 2002 Kellogg was named a Fellow of the Association for Computing Machinery "for contributions to social computing and human-computer interaction (HCI) and for service to ACM". In 2008 she was elected to the CHI Academy. In 2021, Kellogg received the Lifetime Service Award from SIGCHI.
