= UCL Division of Psychology and Language Sciences =

English research centre

Coordinates: 51.52402°N 0.12903°W

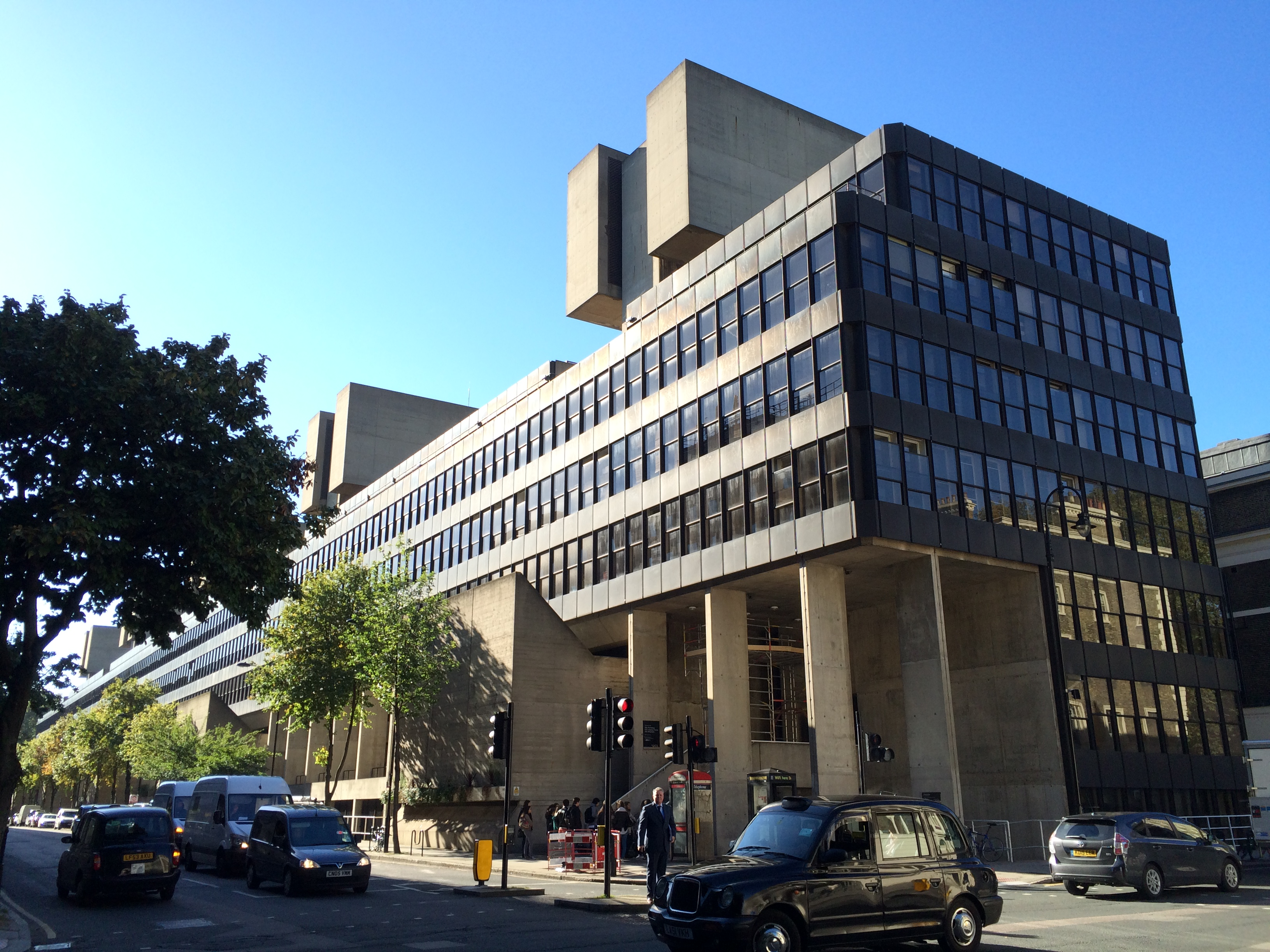
UCL Division of Psychology and Language Sciences, 26 Bedford Way, London.

The UCL Division of Psychology and Language Sciences is a Division within the Faculty of Brain Sciences of University College London (UCL) and is located in London, United Kingdom. The division offers teaching and training and undertakes research in psychology and communication and allied clinical and basic science. It is the largest university psychology department in England.

UCL was one of the first universities in England to establish a psychological laboratory at the end of the 19th century. Notable members of its academic staff have included Oliver Braddick, Cyril Burt, Francis Galton, John Morton, W. H. R. Rivers, Tim Shallice and James Sully. It has a staff of around 330, including 125 academic staff, an annual turnover of £40 million and occupies around 7,000 sq m of laboratory and office space. The division holds active grants for research into a wide range of psychological topics, including mental health treatments, typical and atypical development, brain imaging, cognitive psychology, behavioural neuroscience, and aging and dementia

== History ==
The Division of Psychology and Language Sciences was established in 2008 and was formed from a merger of the previous Department of Psychology, Department of Human Communication Science, and Department of Phonetics and Linguistics. Early interest in the research aspects of psychology was stimulated by the work of individuals from several different departments.

=== Early history ===
In 1837 Professor John Elliotson pioneered the use of mesmerism (hypnotism) during surgical operations at University College Hospital: Charles Dickens was among those who attended some of his demonstrations. Another medical pioneer at the same hospital, this time in the field of psychiatry, was Henry Maudsley. Sir Francis Galton’s work provides foundations for large areas of contemporary psychology, particularly to the fields of differential psychology and psychometrics. He was the first to investigate and measure individual differences in human abilities and traits. He provided evidence that such traits might be largely inherited in man, and he was the first to employ the statistical technique of correlation to assess the relationship between measured qualities. The Eugenics Record Office, which he established in Gower Street in 1904, was the precursor of the Galton Laboratory. His papers are available at the Wellcome Library

Contrasted with Germany and the United States, psychology had a slow birth in the UK. The idea that human behaviour follows repeatable patterns, and that it is possible to discover these patterns or laws by the use of scientific methods, is capable of producing deep passion. In 1877 James Ward proposed that a laboratory should be established in Cambridge to study psychophysics (the relation between the physical properties of stimuli and experienced sensations). This proposal was rejected by the Cambridge Senate on the grounds that it `would insult religion by putting the human soul in a pair of scales’. Psychology of a philosophic type in the tradition of British Empiricism has been taught at UCL since the appointment of George Croom Robertson to the Grote Chair of Mind and Logic in 1866.

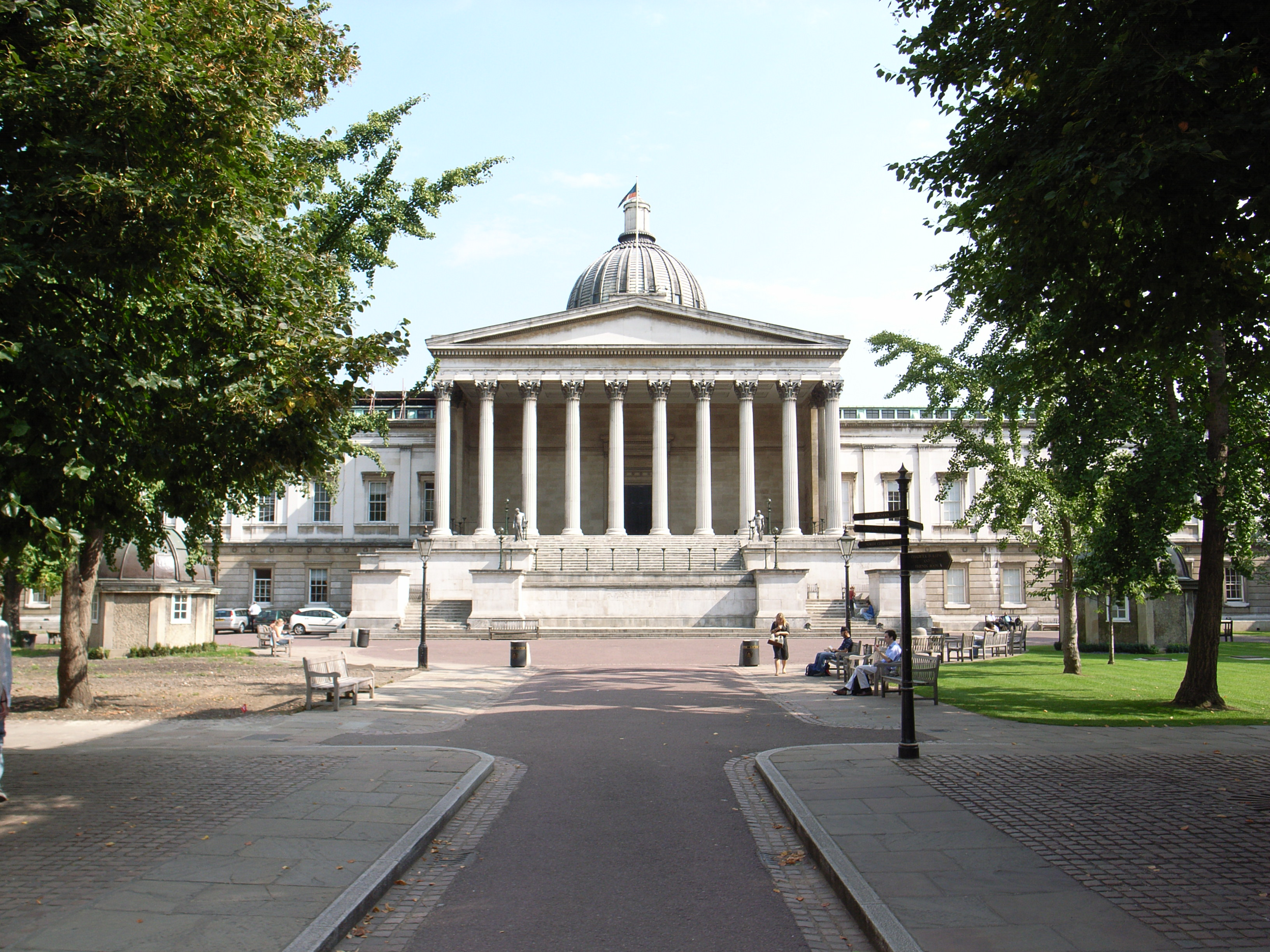
UCL main campus

=== Experimental Psychology at UCL ===
It was Robertson’s successor, James Sully, who first introduced experimental work, and the establishment of a psychological laboratory in 1897 came only some eighteen years after the first ever psychological laboratory was established by Wundt in Leipzig in 1879. In the July 1897 issue of Mind the following notice appeared:

A laboratory for experimental psychology will be opened in University College, London, in October next. The committee have secured a considerable part of the apparatus collected by Prof. Hugo Münsterberg of Freiburg, who is about to migrate permanently to Harvard College. Among those who have contributed to the movement are Mr F. Galton, Prof. H. Sidgwick, Mr A. J. Balfour, Mr R. B. Haldane, Sir John Lubbock, Mr Shadworth Hodgson and Dr Savage. It is hoped that the name of George Croom Robertson may in some way be connected with the laboratory. It is further hoped that Dr W. H. R. Rivers whose work as a teacher in Cambridge and elsewhere is well known will be able to start the work of the laboratory and superintend it during the October term.

Earlier, in 1892, the Second International Congress of Psychology met at University College with Professor Sully as one of the two joint Secretaries. It was therefore appropriate, when the International Congress returned to London in 1969, that University College should again act as host – this time to the Nineteenth International Congress – with the head of the department, Professor G C Drew, as its president.

In 1900 William McDougall was appointed to a part-time readership in experimental psychology in Sully’s department. Of this period Dr May Smith writes: `During this time he used to hold informal discussions in his laboratory and gathered there a small group of people interested in psychology’. This group formed the nucleus of the British Psychological Society which was formally inaugurated at University College on 24 October 1901. In 1920 he moved to Harvard where he succeeded Münsterberg as Professor.

=== Birth of the Psychology Department ===
With the appointment in 1907 of Charles Spearman as Reader, and later as the first occupant of the newly established chair, the Department of Psychology at University College started to grow. Much of its work involved the study of individual differences in ability, and of the development of the mathematical and statistical techniques of measurement and analysis, which remain a current interest. In Sir Cyril Burt, the College found a successor to continue the tradition of Spearman. During the twenty years he occupied the Chair, he made the Department a focus for teaching and research in the measurement and understanding of individual differences. Under his guidance the department also broadened its interests to include child development, delinquency and educational psychology.

The biological emphasis in the department was aided by the appointment of R W Russell as Professor in 1950. The expansion of the teaching staff also enabled him to develop work on human learning, perception and other areas of experimental psychology. Two consequences flowed from his work. The first was the establishment of a close working relationship with other biological departments in the College, and the second was the setting-up of a Medical Research Council Unit concerned largely with work on psychopharmacological problems. In 1959 Professor George C. Drew became Head of Department. During his tenure, the department became a recognised biological science department, incorporated into the Faculty of Science and offering a BSc Honours Degree. Professor Drew’s own research was in the area of skilled behaviour; his work on the effect of alcohol on skills was the basic research which led to the introduction of the breathalyser into England

In 1979 Professor Bob Audley became Head of Department. His interests lay in human experimental psychology, both in basic processes such as decision making, and in applications like medical diagnosis. In the same year the Ergonomics Unit, responsible for the organisation of the University Intercollegiate MSc in Ergonomics, became associated with the department under the direction of Professor John Long. The Ergonomics Unit closed in 2001 on Professor Long’s retirement and was replaced by the UCL Interaction Centre (UCLIC), a joint venture with Computer Science, under the direction of Professor Harold Thimbleby. In October 1982 a new Medical Research Council Cognitive Development Unit, under the direction of Professor John Morton, was set up to strengthen existing work in the department and provide new teaching and research opportunities for both undergraduate and post graduate students. The CDU closed in October 1998 on Professor Morton’s retirement.

In October 1990 Professor Tim Shallice joined the department as Professor of Psychology and Director of Postgraduate Studies. Professor Shallice strengthened the department’s existing work in the field of Cognitive and Computational Neuropsychology. In 1996 UCL set up the multi-disciplinary Institute of Cognitive Neuroscience under the direction of Professor Shallice. The evolutionary psychologist Professor Henry Plotkin was appointed Head of Department in 1993. In the same year Professors Jan Atkinson and Oliver Braddick joined the department, bringing with them the Visual Development Unit. Professor Braddick took over the reins of the Headship of the Department in September 1998. He left in 2001 and was replaced by Professor Alan Johnston who in turn was succeeded by Professor David Shanks in 2003. In 2008, a reorganisation created the Division of Psychology and Language Sciences, which brought together Psychology, Linguistics, and Human Communication under the leadership of Professor Shanks.

=== Birth of the Human Communication Sciences Department ===
The history of the now Language and Cognition department is complex. It originated in the West End Hospital Speech Therapy Training School (Head: Edna Butfield). In 1972 it became the National Hospitals College for Speech Sciences (Head: Dr Jean Cooper, followed by Professor Maggie Snowling) - and now President of St John’s College Oxford. In 1995 it joined with UCL (Head Professor Bill Wells) as Department of Human Communication Science. From 1999 to 2006 Professor Jane Maxim was head of the department. As part of the PaLS formation, the department was then split into Developmental Science and Language & Communication Departments, to be reformed in 2014 as Department of Language & Cognition, with Prof Rosemary Varley as head.

=== Birth of the Phonetics & Linguistics Department ===
In 1971 the two Departments merged under A.C.Gimson; he was succeeded as Head of Department by N.V.Smith (1983–90), J.C.Wells (1990-2000), and now Valerie Hazan (2000-2008). As part of the PaLs formation the Phonetics & Linguistics Department was reformed into the Speech, Hearing & Phonetics Sciences Department with Valerie Hazan as head.

== Research ==
The division receives over £12 million per annum in research grants. The division conducts research into a wide range of neurological diseases, including movement disorders, multiple sclerosis, epilepsy, brain cancer, stroke and brain injury, muscle and nerve disorders, cognitive dysfunction and dementia. REF2014. The outcome of the Government’s 6-year evaluation of research in UK universities, the Research Excellence Framework (REF) which forms the basis for its distribution of £1.6 billion per annum, was published in December 2014 and shows UCL as the top-ranked university for research in Psychology, Psychiatry and Neuroscience. The REF judged 51% of UCL’s research in as world-leading (4*) and 32% as internationally excellent (3*). UCL’s research environment achieved the maximum possible score, 100% at 4*. When weighted by the number of staff submitted, UCL’s ‘power’ score was the highest of any UK institution. The submission also included 28 case studies of the impact of research, and 73% of these were rated world-leading. Impact cases covered diverse research applications such as programmes for helping people to stop smoking, a new drug treatment for multiple sclerosis, computer software for analysing brain imaging data, and stem-cell based transplants for deafness.

=== Research departments and centres ===
The division is home to the following research departments and centres:

- Clinical, Educational, and Health Psychology
- Experimental Psychology
- Institute of Cognitive Neuroscience
- Language & Cognition
- Linguistics
- Speech, Hearing and Phonetic Sciences
- UCL Interaction Centre

The division also has active collaborative research programmes with the UCL Institute of Cognitive Neuroscience, the Gatsby Computational Neuroscience Unit, Leonard Wolfson Experimental Neurology Centre and the Sainsbury Wellcome Centre for Neural Circuits and Behaviour.

== Education ==
The division currently offers undergraduate training in psychology, psychology and language sciences and linguistics, as well as the following graduate level courses:

- Programmes in Clinical Psychology and Psychotherapy
- Programmes in Cognition and Research Skills
- Programmes in Developmental Psychology
- Programmes in Language Sciences and Linguistics
- Programmes in Speech and Language Therapy
- Programmes in Neuroscience
- Programmes in Organisational Psychology
- Programmes in Human-Computer Interaction with Ergonomics
- Research doctorates
- Professional doctorates

== Ranking ==
In the 2017 QS World Rankings Psychology at UCL took 8th place. UCL overall has 9 subjects in the global top 10.

== Notable faculty ==
Notable faculty, past and present, include:

- Prof Cyril Burt
- Prof Tim Shallice
- Prof Charles Spearman

== See also ==
- Francis Crick Institute
- UCL Neuroscience
- UCL Partners
