= Deborah Treisman =

Fiction editor and podcaster (born 1970)

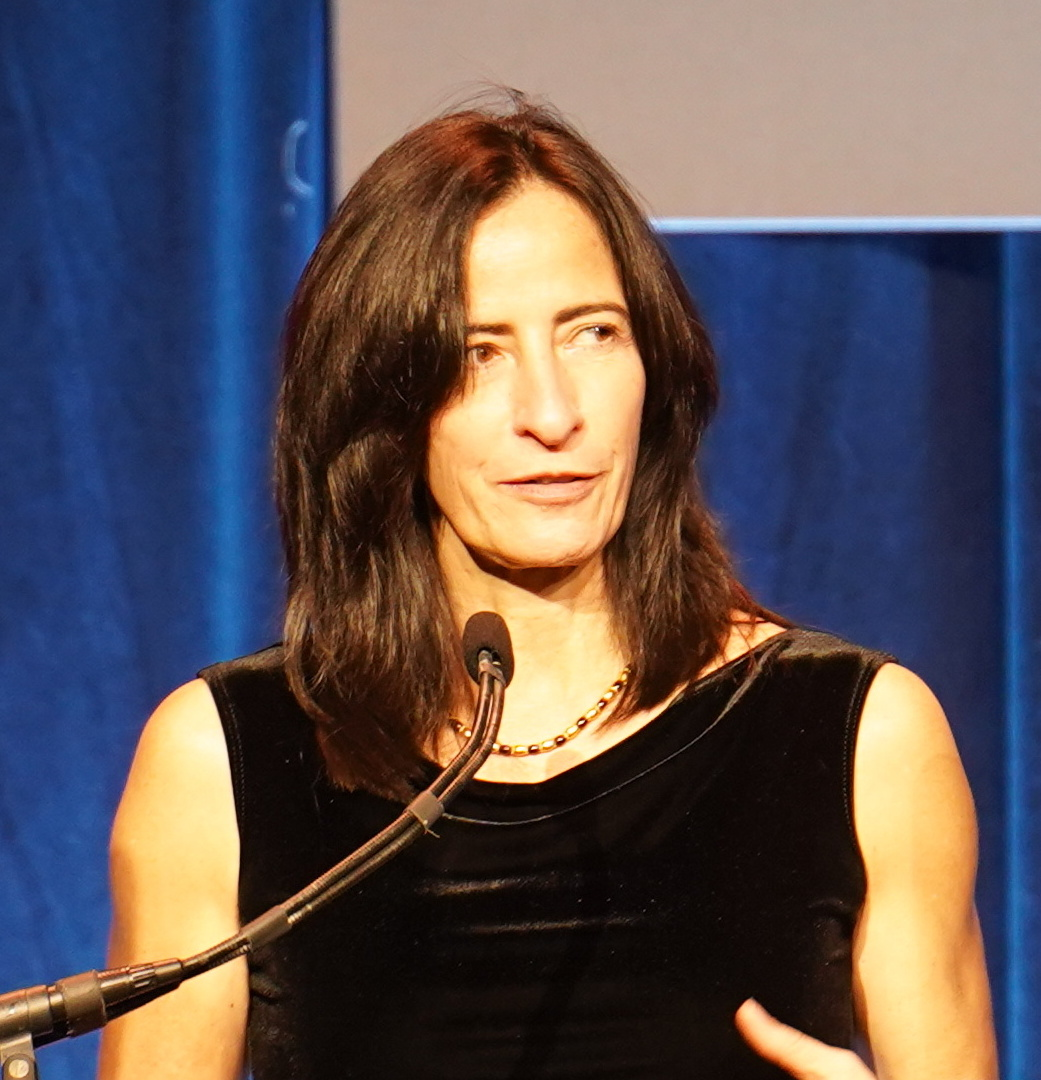
- Deborah Treisman at the 2025 National Book Awards
- Born: 1970 (age 55–56); Oxford, England
- Education: University of California at Berkeley
- Occupations: Literary editor, author and podcaster
- Employer: The New Yorker
- Parent(s): Anne Treisman and Daniel Kahneman (step-father)

Deborah Treisman (born 1970) is the Fiction Editor for The New Yorker. Treisman also hosts craft conversations with The New Yorker short fiction contributors discussing their favorite stories from the magazine's archives in the Fiction podcast, and authors reading their own recently published work in The Writer's Voice podcast.

== Early life and education ==
Treisman was born in Oxford, England, and spent her first years in England. She grew up in a family of scholars. Her mother was the noted cognitive psychologist Anne Treisman. Her stepfather, Daniel Kahneman, won a Nobel prize in economic science. When Treisman was eight, her family relocated to Vancouver, British Columbia.

Treisman submitted her own writing to The New Yorker at age 11. Her submission was rejected. She began her studies at the University of California at Berkeley at age 16 and earned a degree in comparative literature.

== Career ==
In 2003, Treisman took the helm of the magazine's Fiction section after then-Fiction Editor Bill Buford transitioned to other staff work and writing projects of his own. She was hired by Buford and served as his Deputy Fiction Editor from 1997 to 2003. At 32, Treisman was the youngest person to be the magazine's Fiction Editor and only the second woman to do so since Katherine Sergeant Angell White was at the post from the magazine's inception in 1925 until 1960.

Before Treisman's tenure as Fiction Editor, The New York Times reported that The New Yorker published more male than female fiction writers. There was speculation at the time that Treisman might push the section to publish not only more women but also experimental and international writers. In an interview at the time, Treisman said, "We are not short on great work, but why not have variety and why not have the best? With 52 stories a year, we have that kind of flexibility." While data on the gender of authors published at The New Yorker only stretches back to 2010, the nonprofit organization VIDA: Women in Literary Arts reports that at that time, only 26.7% of the magazine's authors were women. In its most recent report in 2019, VIDA showed that 45.0% of The New Yorker contributors were women, 54.9% were men, and .1% of contributors were gender nonbinary. In 2005, the magazine centered its annual Fiction issue on stories by international writers, highlighting such voices as Chile's Roberto Bolaño and Japan's Yōko Ogawa.

One story, "Cat Person", published in a December 2017 issue, follows disturbing developments in a relationship between a 20-year-old woman and an older man. The story, by Kristen Roupenian, sparked an unprecedented readership for a fictional story (an estimated 2 million readers) and heated discussions on social media about consent, gender, and power. Some attribute the large readership to its timing, at the height of the #MeToo movement. In an early 2018 interview with Scroll.in, Treisman described her response and decision to publish the story: "It was an intense read and maybe uncomfortable. My first instinct might have been to say no for that reason but it was actually the best reason to say yes. So I decided to take it."

Before working at The New Yorker, Treisman was the managing editor at Grand Street and worked on the editorial staff of The New York Review of Books, Harper's Magazine, and The Threepenny Review.

== The New Yorker: Fiction ==
The New Yorker: Fiction is a podcast hosted by Treisman and produced by The New Yorker. In each episode a writer is invited to read one of their favorite short stories from The New Yorker's archive. The reading is followed by a discussion with the host. The show has featured guests such as David Sedaris, Ben Marcus, and Salman Rushdie. It releases episodes on a monthly basis.

The show released a few trial episodes in early 2007 and officially debuted that year in October. The episodes are about an hour long and the subject matter is occasionally for a mature audience.

At the Hot Docs Podcast Festival in Toronto in November 2024, the show did a live episode where Margaret Atwood read Varieties of Exile by Mavis Gallant. Sarah Bannan praised the show in The Irish Times saying "the writers are superb. So too are the stories." The show was nominated for a Webby Award in 2020.

== Published work and editorial contributions ==
=== The Dream Colony: A Life in Art ===
In 2017, Bloomsbury USA published The Dream Colony: A Life in Art, a book Treisman co-authored with the artist Walter Hopps and Anne Doran. The Dream Colony is a memoir and visual catalogue of Hopps's life as a curator of art in the second half of the 20th century. In his early twenties, Hopps founded the Ferus Gallery in Los Angeles, which spotlighted West Coast artists. He went on to curate collections at such galleries and institutions as the Pasadena Art Museum (now the Norton Simon Museum of Art), the Washington Gallery of Fine Art, and the Corcoran Gallery of Art. Treisman described Hopps in an interview with The Paris Review: "I think he saw art not as a historical progression—a series of movements over time, each one leading to the next—but as something that happens, in a sense, all at once, a world in which a Renaissance Pietà exists alongside a Duchamp urinal or a Warhol soup can."

In 1990, Hopps signed on as Art Editor for Grand Street. There he worked with Treisman, who became the Managing Editor in 1994, and Doran, who later became the Assistant Art Editor. Treisman describes the trio's process of creating the book as one of collaboration: Doran recorded her interviews of Hopps about his life and the artists he engaged with over his career, and then Treisman would "listen and transcribe whatever seemed useful, turning it into more coherent sentences and paragraphs as [she] went and ignoring whatever wasn’t relevant to the book."

=== 20 Under 40: Stories from The New Yorker ===
In 2010, Treisman and the rest of The New Yorker's Fiction editorial team (Cressida Leyshon, Willing Davidson, Roger Angell) set the task for their annual June Fiction issue as "naming twenty North American writers under the age of forty who [they] felt were, or soon to be, standouts in the diverse and expansive panorama of contemporary fiction." The next several issues of the magazine featured stories from those writers, and those stories were eventually anthologized in the book 20 Under 40: Stories from The New Yorker, published by Farrar, Straus and Giroux that year. The list had 10 women and 10 men who, at the time, had at least one complete book or manuscript and a story on hand for the magazine to publish. It included Chimamanda Ngozi Adichie, Daniel Alarcón, Joshua Ferris, Yiyun Li, ZZ Packer, and Salvatore Scibona.

In her introduction to the anthology, Treisman acknowledges the limitations of lists and explains what set the included writers apart: "These writers are not all iconoclasts; some are purposefully working within existing traditions. But they are all aiming high. In a culture that is flooded with words, sounds, and pictures, they are fighting to get our attention, and to hold it. They are digging within themselves—and around themselves—to bring us news both of the world and of the human heart."

=== Other contributions ===
Treisman has contributed to The New Yorker's Talk of the Town section after the passing of notable fiction writers who contributed to the magazine. In particular, she wrote about her experiences working with David Foster Wallace and about Mavis Gallant's legacy and contributions to the short story. Treisman has also translated works from French into English by such authors as Patrick Chamoiseau and Linda Lê.

== Bibliography ==
- Hopps, Walter, Treisman, Deborah, and Doran, Anne. (2017). The Dream Colony: A Life in Art. Bloomsbury USA.
- (2010). Deborah Treisman (ed.). 20 Under 40: Stories from The New Yorker. Farrar, Straus, and Giroux.
