= Michael Posner (psychologist) =

American psychologist (born 1936)

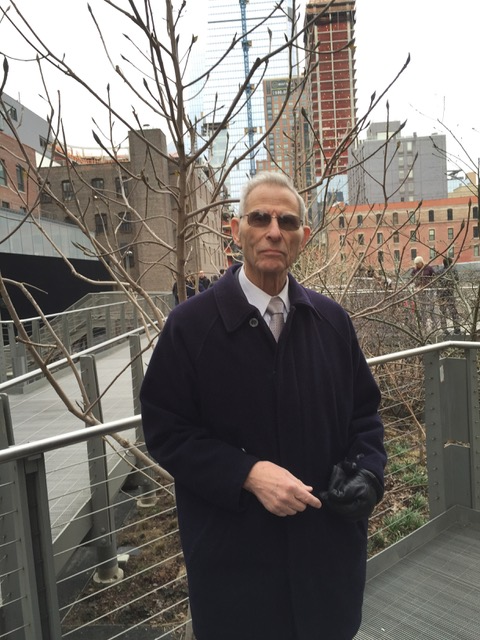
- Posner in 2017
- Born: September 12, 1936 (age 90)
- Education: University of Washington; University of Michigan
- Known for: Neuroscience
- Awards: Karl Spencer Lashley Award (1998); Grawemeyer Award in Psychology (2001); National Medal of Science (2008); National Academy of Sciences (2011); John J. Carty Award for the Advancement of Science (2012)
- Scientific career
- Fields: Psychology
- Workplaces: University of Oregon; Weill Medical College in New York (Sackler Institute)
- Doctoral students: Stanislas Dehaene; Jon Driver; Vicki Hanson; Wendy Kellogg; Daniel Levitin

Michael Ira Posner (/ˈpoʊznər/; born September 12, 1936) is an American psychologist who is a researcher in the field of attention, and the editor of numerous cognitive and neuroscience compilations. He is emeritus professor of psychology at the University of Oregon (Department of Psychology, Institute of Cognitive and Decision Sciences), and an adjunct professor at the Weill Medical College in New York (Sackler Institute). A Review of General Psychology survey, published in 2002, ranked Posner as the 56th most cited psychologist of the 20th century.

== Education and career ==
In 1957, Posner received his BS in physics and in 1959, his MS in psychology from the University of Washington in Seattle, Washington. In 1962, he received his PhD in psychology from the University of Michigan in Ann Arbor, Michigan.

Posner joined the faculty of the University of Wisconsin in Madison, Wisconsin as an assistant professor of psychology. In 1968, he joined the faculty of the University of Oregon in Eugene, Oregon as an associate professor of psychology. He retired from teaching at Oregon in 2000 with the rank of emeritus professor. In 2003, Posner founded and became coordinator of the Brain, Biology and Machine Initiative at the University of Oregon.

Posner studied the role of attention in high-level human tasks such as visual search, reading, and number processing. More recently he investigated the development of attentional networks in infants and young children. A test of an individual's capability to perform attentional shift was formulated by him and bears his name—the Posner cueing task.

In Chronometric Explorations of Mind, published in 1976, Posner applied the subtractive method proposed 110 years earlier by Franciscus Donders to the study of several cognitive functions such as attention and memory. The subtractive method is based on the assumption that mental operations can be measured by decomposing complex cognitive tasks in sequences of simpler tasks. The method assumes that the effect of each mental operation is additive and that it is possible to isolate the effect of a single mental operation by comparing two tasks that differ only by the presence or absence of that mental operation. (See Mental chronometry for additional information on Donders' experiment.)

Posner applied the same subtractive principle to the study of attentional networks using PET (Positron Emission Tomography), a neuroimaging technique that produces three-dimensional functional maps of the brain. In Images of Mind, published with Marcus Raichle in 1994, Posner investigated brain localization of cognitive functions by looking at the patterns of brain activation in progressively more complex cognitive tasks. Posner won the 2001 University of Louisville Grawemeyer Award for Psychology, along with Marcus Raichle and Steven Petersen.

In 2005, the American Psychological Association published an edited volume in tribute to Posner's work. As reported by Steven W. Keele and Ulrich Mayr in that volume, "In May 2003, 10 speakers and a large audience gathered at the University of Oregon in Eugene to pay tribute to the enormously influential contributions Michael Posner has made to the disciplines of psychology and cognitive neuroscience."

== Awards ==
The impact of Posner's theoretical and empirical contributions has been recognized through fellowship in the American Psychological Association, the Association for Psychological Science, the Cognitive Science Society, the Society of Experimental Psychologists, the American Academy of Arts and Sciences, and the American Association for the Advancement of Science.

In 1979, the John Simon Guggenheim Memorial Foundation awarded Posner a Guggenheim Fellowship for 1979–1980. Posner was elected to the United States National Academy of Sciences in 2011.

In 2008, Posner was named as the winner of the National Medal of Science for Behavioral and Social Science. The citation read "For his innovative application of technology to the understanding of brain function, his incisive and accurate modeling of functional tasks, and his development of methodological and conceptual tools to help understand the mind and the development of brain networks of attention".

In 2012, the National Academy of Sciences honored Posner with the John J. Carty Award for the Advancement of Science "For outstanding contributions to the understanding of spatial attention and for pioneering investigations of the neural basis of cognition using non-invasive functional brain imaging methods". In 2014, he was elected a Corresponding Fellow of the British Academy.

== Selected publications ==
- Posner, Michael I. (1976). Chronometric Explorations of Mind. Hillsdale, N.J: Lawrence Erlbaum Associates.
- Posner, Michael I.; Raichle, ME (1994). Images of Mind. Scientific American Books. ISBN 978-0-7167-5045-1.
- Posner, Michael I.; Rothbart, Mary K; Tang, Yiyuan (2013-09-01). "Developing self-regulation in early childhood". Trends in Neuroscience and Education. 2 (3–4): 107–110. doi:10.1016/j.tine.2013.09.001. ISSN 2211-9493. PMC 3927309. PMID 24563845.
- Posner, Michael I. (1980). "Orienting of attention (The 7th Sir F.C. Bartlett Lecture)". Quarterly Journal of Experimental Psychology. 32 (1): 3–25. doi:10.1080/00335558008248231. PMID 7367577. S2CID 2842391.
- Posner, Michael I.; Petersen, Steven E. (1990). "The attention system of the human brain". Annual Review of Neuroscience. 13 (1): 25–42. doi:10.1146/annurev.ne.13.030190.000325. PMID 2183676. S2CID 2995749.

== See also ==
- Two-alternative forced choice
