= Feature integration theory =

Theory of human visual attention

Feature integration theory is a theory of attention developed in 1980 by Anne Treisman and Garry Gelade that suggests that when perceiving a stimulus, features are "registered early, automatically, and in parallel, while objects are identified separately" and at a later stage in processing. The theory has been one of the most influential psychological models of human visual attention.

== Stages ==
=== Preattentive ===
According to Treisman, the first stage of the feature integration theory is the preattentive stage. During this stage, different parts of the brain automatically gather information about basic features (colors, shape, movement, size) that are found in the visual field. The idea that features are automatically separated appears counterintuitive. However, we are not aware of this process because it occurs early in perceptual processing, before we become conscious of the object. Evidence shows that preattentive focuses are accurate due to illusory conjunctions.

=== Focused attention ===
The second stage of feature integration theory is the focused attention stage, where a subject combines individual features of an object to perceive the whole object. Combining individual features of an object requires attention, and selecting that object occurs within a "master map" of locations. The master map of locations contains all the locations in which features have been detected, with each location in the master map having access to the multiple feature maps. These multiple feature maps, or sub-maps, contain a large storage base of features. Features such as color, shape, orientation, sound, and movement are stored in these sub-maps. When attention is focused at a particular location on the map, the features currently in that position are attended to and are stored in "object files". If the object is familiar, associations are made between the object and prior knowledge, which results in identification of that object. This top-down process, using prior knowledge to inform a current situation or decision, is paramount in either identifying or recognizing objects. In support of this stage, researchers often refer to patients with Bálint's syndrome. Due to damage in the parietal lobe, these people are only able to focus attention on individual objects, without deriving meaning from the overall visual field. Given a stimulus that requires combining features, people with Balint's syndrome are unable to focus attention long enough to combine the features, providing support for this stage of the theory.

The stages of feature integration theory

The combining of all feature identifiers to perceive all parts as one whole. This is possible through prior knowledge and cognitive mapping. When an item is seen within a known location and has features that people have knowledge of, then prior knowledge will help bring features all together to make sense of what is perceived. The case of R.M's damage to his parietal lobe, also known as Balint's syndrome, shows the incorporation of focused attention and combination of features in the role of attention.

== Visual tasks ==
Treisman distinguishes between two kinds of visual search tasks, "feature search" and "conjunction search". Feature searches can be performed fast and pre-attentively for targets defined by only one feature, such as color, shape, perceived direction of lighting, movement, or orientation. Features should "pop out" during search and should be able to form illusory conjunctions. Conversely, conjunction searches occur with the combination of two or more features and are identified serially. Conjunction search is much slower than feature search and requires conscious attention and effort. In multiple experiments, some referenced in this article, Treisman concluded that color, orientation, and intensity are features for which feature searches may be performed.

== Experiments ==
To test the notion that attention plays a vital role in visual perception, Treisman and Schmidt (1982) designed an experiment to show that features may exist independently of one another early in processing. Participants were shown a picture involving four objects hidden by two black numbers. The display was flashed for one-fifth of a second followed by a random-dot masking field that appeared on screen to eliminate "any residual perception that might remain after the stimuli were turned off". Participants were to report the black numbers they saw at each location where the shapes had previously been. The results of this experiment verified Treisman and Schmidt's hypothesis. In 18% of trials, participants reported seeing shapes "made up of a combination of features from two different stimuli", even when the stimuli had great differences; this is often referred to as an illusory conjunction. Specifically, illusory conjunctions occur in various situations. For example, you may identify a passing person wearing a red shirt and yellow hat and very quickly transform him or her into one wearing a yellow shirt and red hat. The feature integration theory provides explanation for illusory conjunctions; because features exist independently of one another during early processing and are not associated with a specific object, they can easily be incorrectly combined both in laboratory settings, as well as in real life situations.

As previously mentioned, Balint's syndrome patients have provided support for the feature integration theory. Particularly, Research participant R.M., who had Bálint's syndrome and was unable to focus attention on individual objects, experiences illusory conjunctions when presented with simple stimuli such as a "blue O" or a "red T." In 23% of trials, even when able to view the stimulus for as long as 10 seconds, R.M. reported seeing a "red O" or a "blue T". This finding is in accordance with feature integration theory's prediction of how one with a lack of focused attention would erroneously combine features.

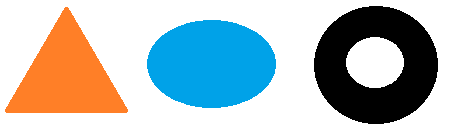
The stimuli resembling a carrot, lake and tire, respectively. Treisman et al. (1986).

If people use their prior knowledge or experience to perceive an object, they are less likely to make mistakes, or illusory conjunctions. To explain this phenomenon, Treisman and Souther (1986) conducted an experiment in which they presented three shapes to participants where illusory conjunctions could exist. Surprisingly, when she told participants that they were being shown a carrot, lake, and tire (in place of the orange triangle, blue oval, and black circle, respectively), illusory conjunctions did not exist. Treisman maintained that prior-knowledge played an important role in proper perception. Normally, bottom-up processing is used for identifying novel objects; but, once we recall prior knowledge, top-down processing is used. This explains why people are good at identifying familiar objects rather than unfamiliar.

Research has demonstrated that congruency between features constrains the binding process. When participants were asked to bind incongruent features together (e.g., a small digit with a large physical size, or a color word written in a conflicting font color), they made significantly more errors than when binding congruent features. This phenomenon, termed the binding congruency effect, suggests that the cognitive system tends to suppress incongruent combinations, affecting the feature-integration.

== Reading ==
When identifying letters while reading, not only are their shapes picked up but also other features like their colors and surrounding elements. Individual letters are processed serially when spatially conjoined with another letter. The locations of each feature of a letter are not known in advance, even while the letter is in front of the reader. Since the location of the letter's features and/or the location of the letter is unknown, feature interchanges can occur if one is not attentively focused. This is known as lateral masking, which in this case, refers to a difficulty in separating a letter from the background.

== See also ==
- Binding problem
- Visual search
