= Broadbent's filter model of attention =

Early theory of attention

Broadbent's filter model is an early selection theory of attention.

== Description ==
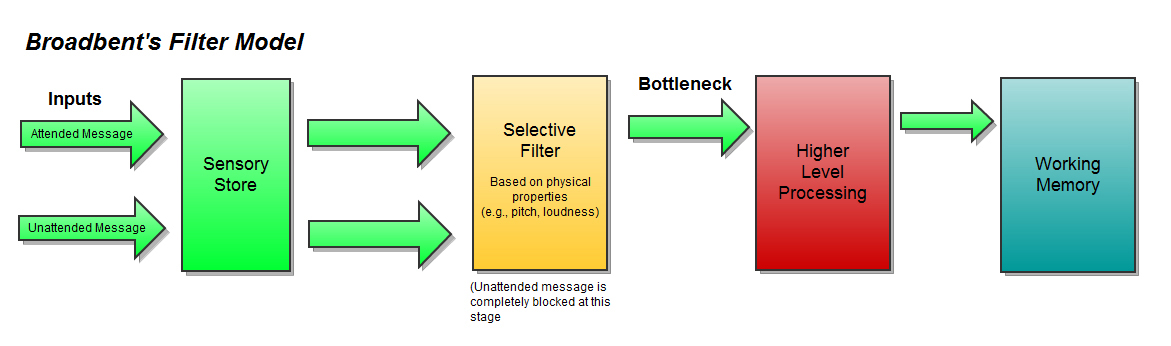
Broadbent's filter model

Donald Broadbent based the development of the filter model from findings by Kennith Craik, who took an engineering approach to cognitive processes. Cherry and Broadbent were concerned with the issue of selective attention. Broadbent was the first to describe the human attentional processing system using an information processing metaphor. In this view, Broadbent proposed a so-called "early selection" view of attention, such that humans process information with limited capacity and select information to be processed early.

Due to this limited capacity, a selective filter is needed for information processing. Broadbent stated that all stimuli are processed initially for basic physical properties. These basic characteristics can include pitch, color, loudness, and direction. Unlike the physical properties, Broadbent believed semantic features, due to their complexity, would impose a limited capacity on the temporary storehouse of incoming stimuli. Therefore, based on physical characteristics, the selective filter allows for certain stimuli to pass through the filter for further processing, while unattended stimuli will be filtered out and lost. Further, goal-directed behaviour requires attention to be controlled; hence a high degree of selectivity is put forth in the information-processing stream. When developing his model, Broadbent emphasized the splitting of incoming stimuli to attended or unattended channels. Channel selection is guided through attention. If one is attempting to attend to a stimulus based on their current goals, they will employ voluntary attention; whereas if a sensory event catches one's attention, reflexive attention will be employed. Information selected to pass through the filter is then available for short-term memory and manipulation of the selected information, prior to storage in long-term memory.

Filter theory then postulates that a selective filter is needed to cope with the overwhelming amount of information entering the channels, such that certain messages must be inhibited or filtered out from the messages that were filtered for further processing. Filter theory reflects an early selection theory because certain information is selected and attended to at a very early stage of information processing.

During his experimentation, Broadbent made use of the dichotic listening test. This task has been used extensively to test numerous psychological phenonomena such as response times of specific auditory information, as well as testing for attended and unattended information presented to a participant. It is widely used as it is a non-invasive method of testing cerebral dominance. In a typical dichotic listening paradigm, the participant is wearing a headphone, in which a different auditory stimuli are presented to each ear at the same time, and the participant's attention is divided. The participant is instructed to attend (attended channel) the information coming from one of the ear pieces and neglect (unattended channel) the information presented from the other. Following the listening period, the participants are tested on whether they recall any information presented in the unattended channel.

Early research using dichotic listening tasks provided empirical evidence of participants' ability to correctly recall information to the attended channel, and poor recalling in the unattended channel. Broadbent used this paradigm in his split-scan experiments, in which he presented participants with different letters in each ear simultaneously and instructed them to repeat them in any order. It resulted in reporting the letters presented to one ear first and then the letters presented from the other ear. This supports Broadbent's filter theory and an early selection model because participants filtered the information based on ear. Participants were then told to repeat the letters in the order they were presented. Accuracy of their answers dropped significantly, which again supports Broadbent's filter theory and an early selection model because switching from ear to ear is difficult and goes against the filter.

== Modern views ==
As psychological research has improved immensely since Broadbent's time, more sophisticated measures indicate that we do have an attentional filter, though it is integrated into a broader cognitive system. This system compensates for the controversies of limited parallel processing in Broadbent's original findings. A major component of the system entails sensory memory, which is broken down into iconic memory and echoic memory. The aforementioned represent visual and auditory memory respectively, which function preattentively. Given the existence of such a preattentive memory store makes it possible for preattentive stimuli to work in a serial manner. Research on iconic memory has provided a visual hierarchy of the visual system, which indicates specific neurons are activated before stimulus recognition, supporting Broadbent's theory of preattentive processing.

Additionally, research has shown that physical features of a stimulus guide attentional selection. It has been found consistently that observers correctly separate relevant from irrelevant stimuli due to physical rather than semantic features, indicating selection channels are heavily influenced by physical features. This then further supports Broadbent's research. According to the modality effect, echoic memory has an advantage over iconic memory. Research has shown that the speech is more apt to objective interpretation than inputs to the visual system. This indicates that auditory information is first processed for its physical features, and then combined with visual information features.

Moreover, allocation of attention is a product of both voluntary and reflexive attention. Goals and behaviors drive attention but may be influenced by an exogenous stimulus of particular stimulus strength, which varies by situation. Such research evidence confirms Broadbent's notion of voluntary attentional mechanisms.

More recent research finds that Broadbent's model neglected to address the time requirements of shifting attention. However, he did distinguish that internal and external stimuli can cause shifts of attention, though he did not consider that internally and externally driven shifts of attention may have differing time courses. Others, such as Treisman, believed that Broadbent's model did not account for all such findings. Treisman, a PhD student under Broadbent, proposed feature integration theory, which asserted that to form a perceptual object, we must first look at its features in the preattentive stage and then bind them in the focus attention stage. Treisman stated that instead of a filter, people have an attenuator and it identifies messages based on its physical properties or by higher level characteristics, such as meaning. Attended messages can be perceived, but according to Treisman's model, unattended messages can be perceived but at a lesser strength, which happens instead of the unattended message being blocking it. These findings based on feature integration theory and the attenuation model contradicted those of Broadbent's model because Broadbent stated that people could not make meaningful connections.
