= Microstimulation =

Stimulation of a small number of neurons

Microstimulation is a technique that stimulates a small population of neurons by passing a small electrical current through a nearby microelectrode.

== Applications ==
Microstimulation is used in neuroanatomical research to identify the functional significance of a group of neurons. For example, Vidal-Gonzalez et al. (2006) applied microstimulation to the rat prelimbic and infralimbic subregions of the medial prefrontal cortex while testing the subjects in a fear-inducing low-footshock condition for various behavioral indicators of fear (such as freezing). This test allowed them to compare the relative fear behavior of rats under microstimulation in either subregion to normal rats in the same condition. The researchers concluded that the prelimbic subregion excites fear behavior while the infralimbic subregion inhibits fear behavior. In this instance, the correlation between stimulation and behavior helped identify the function of these two subregions in the process of fear.

Microstimulation is being explored as a method to deliver sensory percepts to circumvent damaged sensory receptors or pathways. For example, stimulation of primary visual cortex create phosphenes (flashes of light) which can be used to restore some vision for a blind individual. Other applications include bladder prostheses; cochlear and brain-stem auditory prostheses and retinal and thalamic visual prostheses.
