= Anne Treisman =

English cognitive psychologist (1935–2018)

Anne M. Treisman
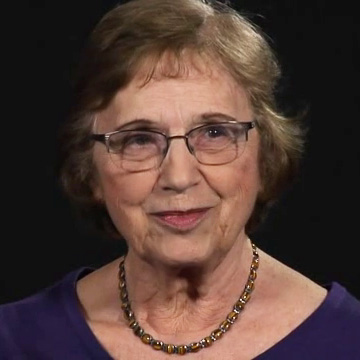
- Treisman in 2011, Princeton University, recipient of the National Medal of Science
- Born: Anne Marie Taylor; 27 February 1935; Wakefield, West Riding of Yorkshire, England
- Died: 9 February 2018 (aged 82); Manhattan, New York City, US
- Education: Newnham College, Cambridge; Somerville College, Oxford
- Known for: Feature integration theory, Attenuation theory
- Spouses: Michel Treisman (m. 1960; div. 1976) Daniel Kahneman (m. 1978)
- Children: Deborah Treisman, and three others
- Awards: Golden Brain Award (1996); Grawemeyer Award in Psychology (2009); National Medal of Science in Behavioral and Social Science (2011)
- Scientific career
- Fields: Psychology
- Workplaces: Princeton University
- Doctoral advisor: Richard C. Oldfield
- Notable students: Postdoctoral fellows Nancy Kanwisher and Nilli Lavie

Anne Marie Treisman (née Taylor; 27 February 1935 – 9 February 2018) was an English psychologist who specialised in cognitive psychology.

Treisman researched visual attention, object perception, and memory. One of her most influential ideas is the feature integration theory of attention, first published with Garry Gelade in 1980. Treisman taught at the University of Oxford, University of British Columbia, University of California, Berkeley, and Princeton University. Notable postdoctoral fellows she supervised included Nancy Kanwisher and Nilli Lavie.

In 2013, Treisman received the National Medal of Science from President Barack Obama for her pioneering work in the study of attention. During her long career, Treisman experimentally and theoretically defined the issue of how information is selected and integrated to form meaningful objects that guide human thought and action.

== Early life and education ==
Anne Treisman was born in Wakefield, West Riding of Yorkshire, England on 27 February 1935. Two years later, her family moved to a village near Rochester, Kent where her father, Percy Taylor, worked as chief education officer during World War II. Her mother, Suzanne Touren, was French. At the age of 11, Treisman moved with her family to Reading, Berkshire where she attended the girls' grammar school Kendrick School. The English educational system at the time required Treisman to choose only three subjects in her last two years at secondary school, and Treisman focused on the language arts (French, Latin and History).

Treisman received her BA in French Literature at Newnham College, Cambridge, in 1954. She received a first class BA with distinction, which earned her a scholarship that she used to obtain a second BA in psychology. During this extra year, Treisman studied under the supervision of Richard Gregory, who introduced her to various methods of exploring the mind through experiments in perception. While at Cambridge, she was active in the folk music scene.

In 1957, Treisman attended Somerville College, Oxford, to work toward her DPhil under her advisor, Carolus Oldfield. Treisman conducted research on aphasia, but soon pursued interest in non-clinical populations. Treisman's research was guided by Donald Broadbent's book, Perception and Communication.

Treisman completed her thesis, "Attention and speech", in 1961.

== Career ==
Treisman discussing her life and career

Around the time Treisman was working toward her DPhil, psychology was shifting from a behaviorist point to view to the idea that behavior is the outcome of active information processing. Donald Broadbent and Colin Cherry had recently introduced the idea of selective listening (often exemplified by the so-called "cocktail party effect") Broadbent later proposed a Filter Model of selective attention which states that unattended auditory information is not analysed but rather it is filtered out early in the process of perception. This theory was criticised because it could not explain why unattended information sometimes gets through the "filter".

After receiving her DPhil, Treisman worked in the Medical Research Council's Psycholinguistics Research Unit at Oxford conducting research in selective listening. In 1964, Treisman proposed her Attenuation Theory, which modified Broadbent's Filter model by stating that unattended information is attenuated rather than completely filtered out. Treisman used a dichotic listening task during which participants heard multiple languages and different voices (male vs. female). She showed that a difference between two equally known languages allowed no more efficient selection than a difference in subject matter between two messages in the same language. Unknown foreign languages, however, produced less interference. It appeared that complete rejection of one language was almost impossible; with some degree of variability depending on physical characteristics and language of the message received. Treisman concluded that features of multiple incoming messages are successfully analysed, and that selection between messages in the same voice, intensity, and localisation takes place during, rather than before or after, this analysis, which results in the identification of their verbal content. Information-handling capacity is limited following this analysis; the process handles one input at a time, either keeping to one message where possible, or switching between the two. Thus, Broadbent's suggestion that classes of words constitute separate "input channels" could be rejected. Her theory also indicated that physical characteristics are processed early, while semantic processing occurs at a later point. Her work had an enormous impact on her field. For example, In 1967, while working as a visiting scientist at Bell Telephone Laboratories' psychology department, she published a paper in Psychological Review that was "central to the development of selective attention as a scientific field of study".

Treisman and Kahneman accepted positions at the University of British Columbia shortly after their marriage. In 1980, Treisman and Gelade published their seminal paper on Feature Integration Theory (FIT). One key element of FIT is that early stages of object perception encode features such as color, form, and orientation as separate entities; focused attention combines these distinct features into perceived objects.

Treisman moved to the University of California, Berkeley, in 1986, where she and Kahneman ran a joint "Attention Lab" in the Psychology Department. From 1993 until her retirement, in 2010, Treisman was a member of the Psychology Department at Princeton University. She was named Princeton's James S. McDonnell Distinguished University Professor of Psychology in 1995. Her work has appeared in 29 book chapters and more than 80 journal articles and is heavily cited in the psychological literature, as well as prominently included in both introductory and advanced textbooks. Established with an anonymous gift in 2015, the Kahneman-Treisman Center for Behavioral Science & Public Policy, housed in Princeton's Woodrow Wilson School, honors the legacy of Daniel Kahneman and Anne Treisman.

=== Feature integration theory ===
Treisman's feature integration theory is a two-stage model of visual object perception:

Pre-attentive stage

The first stage is called "pre-attentive" because it happens automatically, or without effort or attention by the perceiver. In this stage, an object is broken down into its elementary features for processing (i.e., color, texture, shape, etc.). Treisman posits we are unaware of this stage of attention because it occurs quickly and early in perceptual processes (before conscious awareness). Evidence for the pre-attentive state comes from Treisman's own studies. In a well-known study, Treisman created a display of four objects flanked by two black numbers. The display flashed on a computer screen for 1/5 of a second and followed by a random-dot masking field to eliminate residual perception of the stimuli after the stimuli were turned off. Participants were asked to first report on the black numbers, followed by what they saw at each of the four locations where the shapes had been. Under these conditions, participants reported seeing illusory conjunctions in 18% of trials. That is, participants reported seeing objects that consisted of a combination of features from two different stimuli. For example, after seeing a big yellow circle, a big blue triangle, a small red triangle, and a small green circle, a person might report seeing a small red circle and a small green triangle. The reason illusory conjunctions occurred is that stimuli were presented rapidly and the observers' attention was distracted from the target object by having them focus on the black numbers; thus, elementary features had not yet been grouped or bound to an object. Having participants attend to the target objects eliminated the illusory conjunction.

Focused attention stage

The second stage of processing depends on attention. In this stage, the features are combined, resulting in the perception of a whole object rather than individual features. Treisman linked this process of binding to neural activity, noting that an object causes activity in both the "what" and "where" areas of the cortex (see Two-streams hypothesis). Activity in the "what" processing stream would include information about color and form, while activity in the "where" stream would include information about location and motion. According to Treisman, attention is the "glue" that combines the information from both streams and causes us to perceive all the features of an object as combined at one specific location. Perceiving one object in isolation appears relatively straightforward, but when we confront multiple objects, numerous features may exist at different locations. The perceptual system's task is to associate each of these features with the object to which it belongs. Feature integration theory says that in order for this to occur, we need to focus our attention on each object in turn. Once we attend to a particular location, the features at that location are bound together and are associated with the object at that location.

Treisman's FIT model uses three different spatially selective mechanisms to solve the binding problem: selection by a spatial attention window, inhibition of locations from feature maps containing unwanted features, and top-down activation of the location containing the attended object.

=== The binding problem ===
William James discussed the connection between attention and mental processes, "Millions of items…are present to my senses which never properly enter my experience. Why? Because they have no interest for me. My experience is what I agree to attend to…Everyone knows what attention is. It is the taking possession by the mind, in clear and vivid form, of one out of what seem several simultaneously possible objects or trains of thought…. It implies withdrawal from some things in order to deal effectively with others."

In the early 1980s, neuroscientists such as Torsten Wiesel and David H. Hubel were discovering that different areas of the primate visual cortex were finely tuned to selective features, such as line orientation, luminance, color, movement, etc. These findings prompted the question of how these distinct features are connected into a unified whole. This question has been called the binding problem. For example, when you see a red ball roll by, cells sensitive to movement fire in the medial temporal cortex, while cells sensitive to color, shape and location fire in other areas. Despite all this distinct neuronal firing, you don't perceive the ball as separated by shape, movement and color perceptions; you experience an integrated experience with all these components occurring together. The question of how these elements are combined is the essence of the binding problem, a central focus of research into the late 1990s. A number of possible mechanisms were envisaged, including grandmother cells responding to specific conjunctions of features that uniquely identify a particular object; local cell assemblies onto which the pathways from different feature maps converge, perhaps with adjustable connections allowing flexible routing of signals; a serial scan of different spatial areas selected by an adjustable attention window, conjoining the features that each contains and excluding features from adjacent areas; detection of temporal contiguity – parts and properties whose onset, offset or motion coincide probably belong to the same object synchronised firing of cells responding to features of the same object, perhaps assisted by oscillatory neural activity. Treisman used failures of binding to shed light on its underlying mechanisms. Specifically, she found that left-brain-damaged patients have increasing illusory conjunctions and decreased performance in a spatially cued attention task, which suggests a link between attentional binding and the parietal lobes. Treisman also cited corroborating evidence from positron emission tomography and event-related potential studies which were consistent with the spatial attention account of feature integration.

Treisman's work formed the basis for thousands of experiments in cognitive psychology, vision sciences, cognitive science, cognitive neuropsychology and cognitive neuroscience.

== Honors ==
Treisman was elected to the Royal Society of London in 1989, the US National Academy of Sciences in 1994, the American Academy of Arts and Sciences in 1995, and the American Philosophical Society in 2005, as well as a William James Fellow of the American Psychological Society in 2002. Treisman was the recipient of the 2009 University of Louisville Grawemeyer Award in Psychology for her explanation of how our brains build meaningful images from what we see. In 2013, Treisman received the National Medal of Science from President Barack Obama for her pioneering work in the study of attention.

== Selected publications ==
Key works include:

- Treisman, A.; Gelade, G. (1980). "A feature integration theory of attention". Cognitive Psychology. 12 (1): 97–136. doi:10.1016/0010-0285(80)90005-5. PMID 7351125. S2CID 353246.
- Treisman, A. (1991). "Search, similarity and the integration of features between and within dimensions". Journal of Experimental Psychology: Human Perception and Performance. 17 (3): 652–676. doi:10.1037/0096-1523.17.3.652. PMID 1834783.
- Treisman, A. (November 1986). "Features and Objects in Visual Processing" (PDF). Scientific American. 255 (5). New York City: 114–125. Bibcode:1986SciAm.255e.114T. doi:10.1038/scientificamerican1186-114B. Archived from the original (PDF) on 20 October 2016.

== Personal life ==
Treisman married Michel Treisman in 1960, another Oxford graduate student. They divorced in 1976. She remarried in 1978 to Daniel Kahneman, who won the Nobel Memorial Prize for Economics in 2002.

She had four children: Jessica Treisman (b. 1963), a professor of cell biology at NYU School of Medicine; Daniel Treisman (b. 1964), a professor of political science at UCLA; Stephen Treisman (b. 1968), who lives in Berkshire; and Deborah Treisman (b. 1970), a fiction editor at The New Yorker.

She died on 9 February 2018, from a stroke, at her home in Manhattan.

== See also ==
- Subitizing
