= Lateral masking =

Problem in visual perception

Barcodes are difficult to process for the human mind because of lateral masking.

Lateral masking is a problem for the human visual perception of identical or similar entities in close proximity. This can be illustrated by the difficulty of counting the vertical bars of a barcode.

In linguistics lateral masking refers to the interference a letter has on its neighbor. This is a problem readers encounter when reading a word. The identity of a letter in the middle of a word is obscured by the presence of its neighboring letters.

Lateral masking may also be a problem in orthography design. A readable orthography will avoid situations in which a reader is faced with severe lateral masking.
