= UCL Neuroscience =

Department of University College London

Coordinates: 51.52211°N 0.12332°W

- Established: 2008
- Location: London, United Kingdom
- Website: UCL Neuroscience

UCL Neuroscience is a research domain that encompasses the breadth of neuroscience research activity across University College London's (UCL) School of Life and Medical Sciences. The domain was established in January 2008, to coordinate neuroscience activity across the many UCL departments and institutes in which neuroscience research takes place. In 2014, the Nobel Prize in Physiology or Medicine was awarded to the UCL neuroscientist John O'Keefe. In two consecutive years 2017 and 2018, the Brain Prize, the world's most valuable prize for brain research at €1m, was awarded to UCL neuroscientists Peter Dayan, Ray Dolan, John Hardy, and Bart De Strooper.

UCL Neuroscience comprises over 450 senior principal investigators and includes 26 Fellows of the Royal Society and 60 Fellows of the Academy of Medical Sciences. It is currently ranked second in the world for neuroscience and behaviour by Thomson ISI Essential Science Indicators.

== History ==
=== 20th century ===
UCL has a long tradition in the neurosciences. Henry Dale and Otto Loewi both worked in Ernest Starling's laboratory in 1904 and went on to share the 1936 Nobel Prize for Medicine for their seminal investigation on the chemical transmission of nerve impulses. Starling's successor, Archibald Hill, fostered the career of Bernard Katz, whose long association with UCL began in 1935. Later on in 1970, he shared the Nobel Prize with Ulf von Euler, who had also worked in Hill's laboratory at UCL, and Julius Axelrod, once again for work on chemical neurotransmission.

Fatt and Katz were the first to propose that neurotransmitter release at synapses was quantal in nature. They also uncovered the mechanism underlying inhibitory synaptic transmission.

In a series of seminal papers in the early 1970s, Katz and Ricardo Miledi, described a statistical analysis of fluctuations they observed in the membrane potential at the frog neuromuscular junction, which were induced by acetylcholine. This approach, which became known as ‘noise analysis’, allowed the first measurement of the conductance and lifetime of single ACh receptor channels.

Katz's work had a strong influence on another future Nobel Prize winner, Bert Sakmann. He spent two years at UCL in Katz's biophysics laboratory and it was here that he developed his interest in the molecular aspects of synaptic transmission. He went on to directly measure singe ion channel currents by developing the now ubiquitously used patch-clamp technique with Erwin Neher. They shared the 1991 Prize in recognition of their work on the function of single ion channels

Neuroscience at UCL has long been a major cross-disciplinary endeavour. Indeed, JZ Young, Professor of Anatomy, 1945–74, discovered and was the first to investigate the squid giant axon. Young's work on squid giant axons was utilized by Andrew Huxley and Alan Hodgkin who in 1963 received the Nobel Prize for their work on the conduction of action potentials along nerve fibres. To achieve this, they developed a voltage-clamp technique to demonstrate that impulse transmission relied upon the selective permeability of the nerve fibre membrane to particular ions. This ground-breaking advance laid the foundations for much of modern-day electrophysiology.

=== 21st century ===
In June 2004, a team of researchers from the Wellcome Department of Imaging Neuroscience at UCL published research in Nature describing how the human brain subconsciously remembers the details of past dangers. In December 2004, researchers from the UCL Institute of Cognitive Neuroscience published research identifying the part of the human brain where unconscious fluid movements are stored. In 2005, Tania Singer and Professor Christopher Donald Frith of the UCL Institute of Cognitive Neuroscience and the Functional Imaging Laboratory published the results of a study using transcranial magnetic stimulation which showed for the first time the role of sensorimotor components in empathy for pain in other people. In February 2006, a team from UCL led by Dr Leun Otten published research showing that it may be possible to predict how well the human brain will remember something before the event has even taken place.

In April 2006, a team from the UCL Institute of Cognitive Neuroscience published research showing that individuals with a skill for learning other languages could have more "white brain matter" in a part of the brain which processes sound. In August 2006, a team led by Dr Emrah Duzel of the UCL Institute of Cognitive Neuroscience published research showing that exposure to new experiences can boost the memory of the human brain. In January 2007 Professor van der Lely of the UCL Centre for Developmental Language Disorders and Cognitive Neuroscience published details of a 10-minute screening test capable of identifying pre-school children who might be dyslexic.

In June 2008, a team led by Professor Maria Fitzgerald of UCL Neuroscience, Physiology and Pharmacology published research showing that infants may be experiencing discomfort when their body movements, blood pressure and facial expressions show them to be pain free.

In March 2009 a team led by Professor Eleanor Maguire of UCL published a study showing that it is possible read a person's spatial memories by using a brain scanner to monitor the electrical activity of the brain. In December 2009, Professor Sophie Scott of the UCL Institute of Cognitive Neuroscience conducted research into how the human voice works and interacts with the brain as part of BBC Radio 4's Vox Project.

In March 2010, Stephanie Burnett of UCL published a study of attitudes to risk which showed that adolescents are more excited when they have lucky escapes when playing video games than other age groups. In June 2010, academics from the UCL Institute of Cognitive Neuroscience published research suggesting that humans have a distorted "mental map" of their hands, which stretches them in one direction and squashes them in the other. In September 2010 academics from the UCL Institute of Cognitive Neuroscience, Pompeu Fabra University, ICREA and the University of Barcelona published research identifying an area of the human brain which constructs a 'map' of the human body in space using a combination of tactile information from the skin and proprioceptive information about the position of the hands relative to the rest of the body.

== Organisation ==
UCL Neuroscience is organised thematically across faculties at UCL but is principally associated with the four faculties of Brain Sciences, Life Sciences, Medical Sciences and Population Health Sciences.

There are many inter-departmental and cross-faculty research groups and centres associated with UCL Neuroscience and PIs are also based in numerous other departments across UCL.

== Research ==
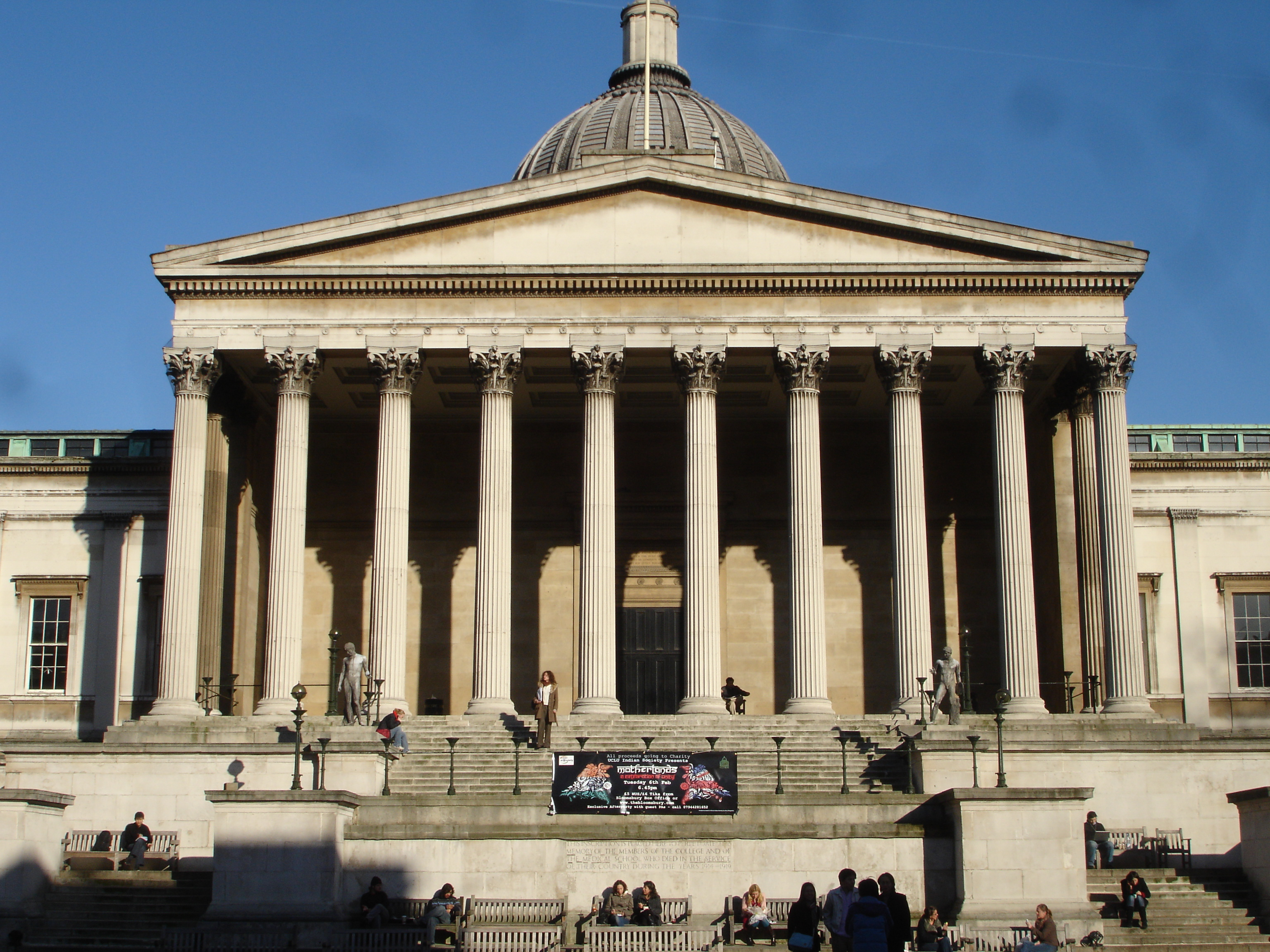
The main portico of University College London

UCL Neuroscience is ranked second in the world (and first in Europe) for neuroscience and behaviour by Thomson ISI Essential Science Indicators, with more than twice as many publications and citations as any other European institution. UCL Neuroscience generates over 30% of the UK's contribution to the most highly cited publications in neuroscience, more than twice as much as any other university. In neuroimaging and clinical neurology, UCL produces 65% and 44% respectively of the UK's contribution to the world's most highly cited papers. UCL Neuroscience raised over £312 million in research funding over the period 2005 to 2010.

Neuroscience-related departments outside the life and biomedical sciences faculties include:

- UCL Chemistry
- UCL Computer Science
- UCL Mathematics
- UCL Medical Physics and Bioengineering
- UCL Philosophy

Cross-cutting neuroscience centres:

- UCL Centre for Advanced Biomedical Imaging
- Centre for Developmental Cognitive Neuroscience
- Centre for Educational Neuroscience
- UCL Centre for Human Communication
- UCL Centre for Medical Image Computing (CMIC)
- Deafness Cognition And Language Research Centre (DCAL)
- UCL Institute of Behavioural Neuroscience
- UCL Institute of Movement Neuroscience
- London Centre for Nanotechnology

Many UCL Neuroscience researchers are also involved in the translational research at the three biomedical research centres at UCL and its associated hospitals:

- UCLH/UCL Comprehensive Biomedical Research Centre
- ICH/GOSH Specialist Biomedical Research Centre
- IOO/Moorfieids Specialist Biomedical Research Centre

== See also ==
- UCL Faculty of Engineering Sciences
- National Hospital for Neurology and Neurosurgery
- UCL Partners
- Francis Crick Institute
