= Pure-tone audiometry =

Medical test

Pure tone audiometry
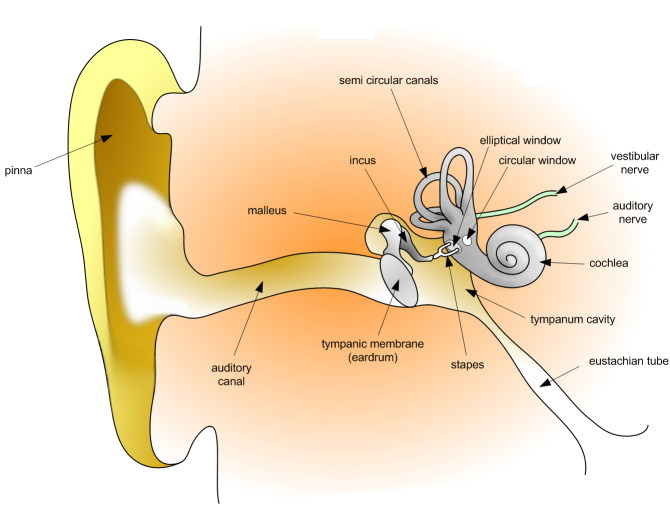
- Diagram of the human ear
- ICD-9-CM: 95.41
- MeSH: D001301
- eMedicine: 1822962

Pure-tone audiometry is the main hearing test used to identify hearing threshold levels of an individual, enabling determination of the degree, type and configuration of a hearing loss and thus providing a basis for diagnosis and management. Pure-tone audiometry is a subjective, behavioural measurement of a hearing threshold, as it relies on patient responses to pure tone stimuli. Therefore, pure-tone audiometry is only used on adults and children old enough to cooperate with the test procedure. As with most clinical tests, standardized calibration of the test environment, the equipment and the stimuli is needed before testing proceeds (in reference to ISO, ANSI, or other standardization body). Pure-tone audiometry only measures audibility thresholds, rather than other aspects of hearing such as sound localization and speech recognition. However, there are benefits to using pure-tone audiometry over other forms of hearing test, such as click auditory brainstem response (ABR). Pure-tone audiometry provides ear specific thresholds, and uses frequency specific pure tones to give place specific responses, so that the configuration of a hearing loss can be identified. As pure-tone audiometry uses both air and bone conduction audiometry, the type of loss can also be identified via the air-bone gap. Although pure-tone audiometry has many clinical benefits, it is not perfect at identifying all losses, such as ‘dead regions’ of the cochlea and neuropathies such as auditory processing disorder (APD). This raises the question of whether or not audiograms accurately predict someone's perceived degree of disability.

== Pure-tone audiometry procedural standards ==
The current International Organization for Standardization (ISO) standard for pure-tone audiometry is ISO:8253-1, which was first published in 1983. The current American National Standards Institute (ANSI) standard for pure-tone audiometry is ANSI/ASA S3.21-2004, prepared by the Acoustical Society of America.

In the United Kingdom, The British Society of Audiology (BSA) is responsible for publishing the recommended procedure for pure-tone audiometry, as well as many other audiological procedures. The British recommended procedure is based on international standards. Although there are some differences, the BSA-recommended procedures are in accordance with the ISO:8253-1 standard. The BSA-recommended procedures provide a "best practice" test protocol for professionals to follow, increasing validity and allowing standardisation of results across Britain.

In the United States, the American Speech–Language–Hearing Association (ASHA) published Guidelines for Manual Pure-Tone Threshold Audiometry in 2005.

== Variations ==
There are cases where conventional pure-tone audiometry is not an appropriate or effective method of threshold testing. Procedural changes to the conventional test method may be necessary with populations who are unable to cooperate with the test in order to obtain hearing thresholds. Sound field audiometry may be more suitable when patients are unable to wear earphones, as the stimuli are usually presented by loudspeaker. A disadvantage of this method is that although thresholds can be obtained, results are not ear specific. In addition, response to pure tone stimuli may be limited, because in a sound field pure tones create standing waves, which alter sound intensity within the sound field. Therefore, it may be necessary to use other stimuli, such as warble tones in sound field testing. There are variations of conventional audiometry testing that are designed specifically for young children and infants, such as behavioral observation audiometry, visual reinforcement audiometry and play audiometry.

Conventional audiometry tests frequencies between 250 Hertz (Hz) and 8 kHz, whereas extended high-frequency audiometry tests in the region of 8 kHz-16 kHz. Some environmental factors, such as ototoxic medication and noise exposure, appear to be more detrimental to high frequency sensitivity than to that of mid or low frequencies. Therefore, extended high frequency audiometry is an effective method of monitoring losses that are suspected to have been caused by these factors. It is also effective in detecting the auditory sensitivity changes that occur with aging.

== Cross hearing and interaural attenuation ==
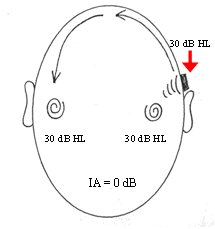
Interaural attenuation with bone conduction

When sound is applied to one ear the contralateral cochlea can also be stimulated to varying degrees, via vibrations through the bone of the skull. When the stimuli presented to the test ear stimulates the cochlea of the non-test ear, this is known as cross hearing. Whenever it is suspected that cross hearing has occurred it is best to use masking. This is done by temporarily elevating the threshold of the non-test ear, by presenting a masking noise at a predetermined level. This prevents the non-test ear from detecting the test signal presented to the test ear. The threshold of the test ear is measured at the same time as presenting the masking noise to the non-test ear. Thus, thresholds obtained when masking has been applied, provide an accurate representation of the true hearing threshold level of the test ear.

A reduction or loss of energy occurs with cross hearing, which is referred to as interaural attenuation (IA) or transcranial transmission loss. IA varies with transducer type. It varies from 40 dB to 80 dB with supra-aural headphones. However, with insert earphones it is in the region of 55 dB. The use of insert earphones reduces the need for masking, due to the greater IA which occurs when they are used (See Figure 1).

Air conduction results in isolation, give little information regarding the type of hearing loss. When the thresholds obtained via air conduction are examined alongside those achieved with bone conduction, the configuration of the hearing loss can be determined. However, with bone conduction (performed by placing a vibrator on the mastoid bone behind the ear), both cochleas are stimulated. IA for bone conduction ranges from 0-20 dB (See Figure 2). Therefore, conventional audiometry is ear specific, with regards to both air and bone conduction audiometry, when masking is applied.

== Pure-tone audiometry thresholds and hearing disability ==
Pure-tone audiometry is described as the gold standard for assessment of a hearing loss but how accurate pure-tone audiometry is at classifying the hearing loss of an individual, in terms of hearing impairment and hearing disability is open to question. Hearing impairment is defined by the World Health Organization (WHO) as a hearing loss with thresholds higher than 25db in one or both ears. The degree of hearing loss is classified as mild, moderate, severe or profound. The results of pure-tone audiometry are however a very good indicator of hearing impairment.

Hearing disability is defined by the WHO as a reduction in the ability to hear sounds in both quiet and noisy environments (compared to people with normal hearing), which is caused by a hearing impairment. Several studies have investigated whether self-reported hearing problems (via questionnaires and interviews) were associated with the results from pure-tone audiometry. The findings of these studies indicate that in general, the results of pure-tone audiometry correspond to self-reported hearing problems (i.e. hearing disability). However, for some individuals this is not the case; the results of pure-tone audiometry only, should not be used to ascertain an individual's hearing disability.

Figure 10: Speech recognition threshold (SRT) with noise. To aid explanation of this concept the CHL and the SNHL have the same magnitude of hearing loss (50 dBHL). The horizontal part of the curves is where the noise is inaudible. Thus, there is no masking effect on the SRT. The horizontal portion of the curve for the SNHL and CHL extends further than that for a normal hearing person, as the noise needs to become audible to become a problem. Thus, more noise has to be applied, to produce a masking effect. At the right hand side of the graph, to identify 50% of the speech correctly, the speech needs to much more intense than in the quiet. This is because at this end of the graph, the noise is very loud whether the person has a hearing loss or not. There is a transition between these two areas described. Factor A is a problem only in low noise levels, whereas Factor D is a problem when the noise level is high.

Hearing impairment (based on the audiogram) and auditory handicap (based on speech discrimination in noise) data was reviewed by Reinier Plomp. This led to the formulation of equations, which described the consequences of a hearing loss on speech intelligibility. The results of this review indicated that there were two factors of a hearing loss, which were involved in the effect on speech intelligibility. These factors were named Factor A and Factor D. Factor A affected speech intelligibility by attenuating the speech, whereas Factor D affected speech intelligibility by distorting the speech.

Speech recognition threshold (SRT) is defined as the sound pressure level at which more than 50% of the speech is identified correctly. For a person with a conductive hearing loss (CHL) in quiet, the SRT needs to be higher than for a person with normal hearing. The increase in SRT depends on the degree of hearing loss only, so Factor A reflects the audiogram of that person. In noise, the person with a CHL has the same problem as the person with normal hearing (See Figure 10).

For a person with a Sensorineural hearing loss (SNHL) in quiet, the SRT also needs to be higher than for a person with normal hearing. This is because the only factor that is important in quiet for a CHL and a SNHL is the audibility of the sound, which corresponds to Factor A. In noise, the person with a SNHL requires a better signal-to-noise ratio to achieve the same performance level, as the person with normal hearing and the person with a CHL. This shows that in noise, Factor A is not enough to explain the problems of a person with a SNHL. Therefore, there is another problem present, which is Factor D. At present, it is not known what causes Factor D. Thus, in noise the audiogram is irrelevant. It is the type of hearing loss that is important in this situation.

These findings have important implications for the design of hearing aids. As hearing aids at present can compensate for Factor A, but this is not the case for Factor D. This could be why hearing aids are not satisfactory for a lot of people.

== Audiograms and hearing loss ==
The shape of the audiogram resulting from pure-tone audiometry gives an indication of the type of hearing loss as well as possible causes. Conductive hearing loss due to disorders of the middle ear shows as a flat increase in thresholds across the frequency range. Sensorineural hearing loss will have a contoured shape depending on the cause. Presbycusis or age-related hearing loss for example is characterized by a high frequency roll-off (increase in thresholds). Noise-induced hearing loss has a characteristic notch at 4000 Hz. Other contours may indicate other causes for the hearing loss.

== See also ==
- Hearing range
- Auditory masking
- Auditory filters
- Absolute threshold of hearing
- Equal-loudness contours
- Pure tone
