= Audiometry =

Branch of audiology measuring hearing sensitivity

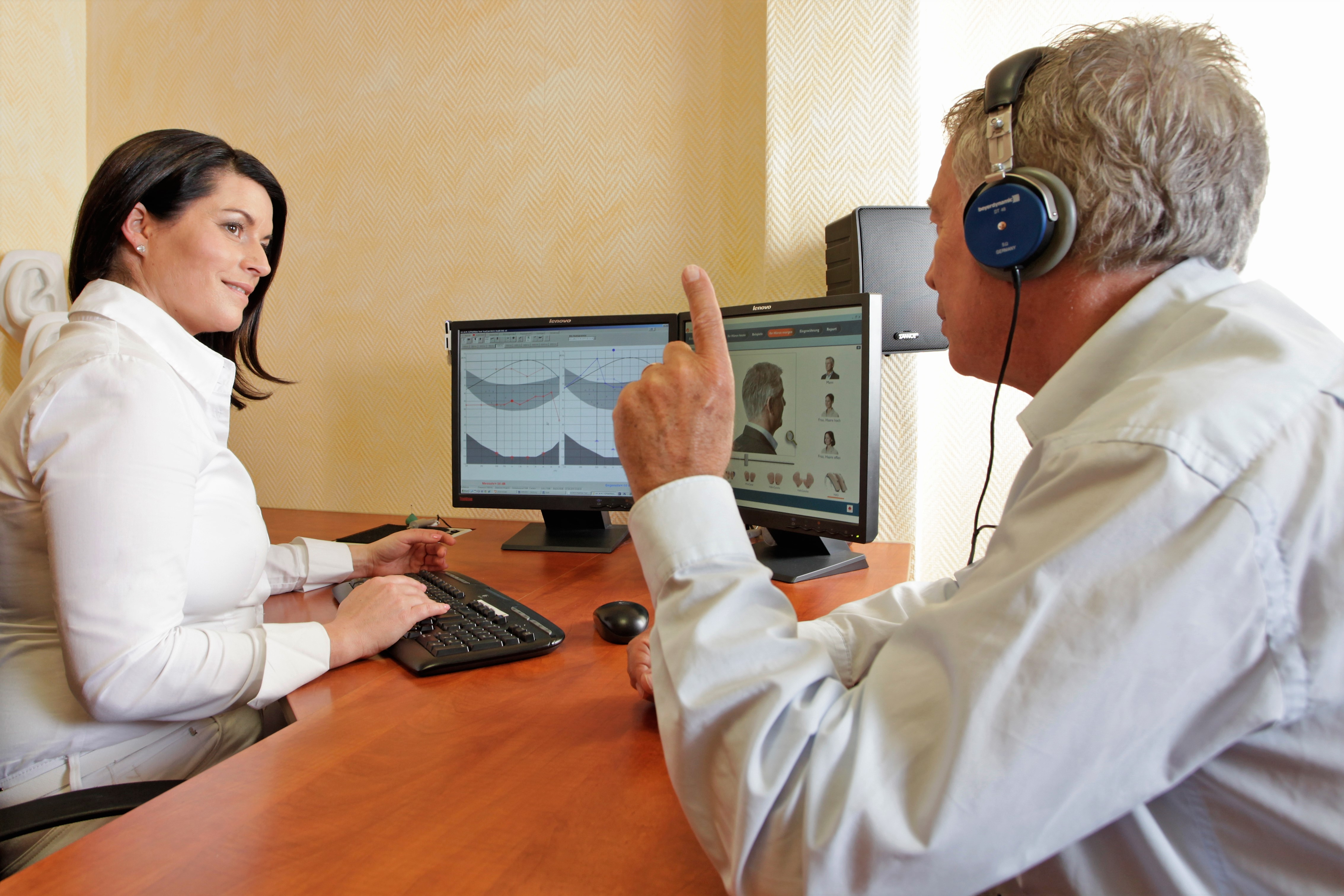
- ICD-10-PCS: F13Z1 - F13Z6
- ICD-9-CM: 95.41
- MeSH: D001299
- MedlinePlus: 003341

Audiometry (from Latin audīre 'to hear' and metria 'to measure') is a branch of audiology and the science of measuring hearing acuity for variations in sound intensity and pitch and for tonal purity, involving thresholds and differing frequencies. Typically, audiometric tests determine a subject's hearing levels with the help of an audiometer, but may also measure ability to discriminate between different sound intensities, recognize pitch, or distinguish speech from background noise. Acoustic reflex and otoacoustic emissions may also be measured. Results of audiometric tests are used to diagnose hearing loss or diseases of the ear, and often make use of an audiogram.

== History ==
The basic requirements of the field were to be able to produce a repeating sound, some way to attenuate the amplitude, a way to transmit the sound to the subject, and a means to record and interpret the subject's responses to the test.

=== Mechanical "acuity meters" and tuning forks ===
For many years there was desultory use of various devices capable of producing sounds of controlled intensity. The first types were clock-like, giving off air-borne sound to the tubes of a stethoscope; the sound distributor head had a valve that could be gradually closed. Another model used a tripped hammer to strike a metal rod and produce the testing sound; in another, a tuning fork was struck. The first such measurement device for testing hearing was described by Wolke (1802).

=== Pure tone audiometry and audiograms ===
Following development of the induction coil in 1849 and audio transducers (telephone) in 1876, a variety of audiometers were invented in United States and overseas. These early audiometers were known as induction-coil audiometers due to...

- Hughes 1879
- Hartmann 1878

In 1885, Arthur Hartmann designed an "Auditory Chart" which included left and right ear tuning fork representation on the x -axis and percent of hearing on the y-axis.

In 1899, Carl E. Seashore Prof. of Psychology at U. Iowa, United States, introduced the audiometer as an instrument to measure the "keenness of hearing" whether in the laboratory, schoolroom, or office of the psychologist or aurist. The instrument operated on a battery and presented a tone or a click; it had an attenuator set in a scale of 40 steps. His machine became the basis of the audiometers later manufactured at Western Electric.

- Cordia C. Bunch 1919

The concept of a frequency versus sensitivity (amplitude) audiogram plot of human hearing sensitivity was conceived by German physicist Max Wien in 1903. The first vacuum tube implementations, November 1919, two groups of researchers — K.L. Schaefer and G. Gruschke, B. Griessmann and H. Schwarzkopf — demonstrated before the Berlin Oto-logical Society two instruments designed to test hearing acuity. Both were built with vacuum tubes. Their designs were characteristic of the two basic types of electronic circuits used in most electronic audio devices for the next two decades. Neither of the two devices was developed commercially for some time, although the second was to be manufactured under the name "Otaudion." The Western Electric 1A, developed by <who> was built in 1922 in the United States. It was not until 1922 that otolaryngologist Dr. Edmund P. Fowler, and physicists Dr. Harvey Fletcher and Robert Wegel of Western Electric Co. first employed frequency at octave intervals plotted along the x axis and intensity downward along the y-axis as a degree of hearing loss. Fletcher et al. also coined the term "audiogram" at that time.

With further technologic advances, bone conduction testing capabilities became a standard component of all Western Electric audiometers by 1928.

=== Electrophysiologic audiometry ===
In 1967, Sohmer and Feinmesser were the first to publish auditory brainstem responses (ABR), recorded with surface electrodes in humans which showed that cochlear potentials could be obtained non-invasively.

=== Otoacoustic audiometry ===
In 1978, David Kemp reported that sound energy produced by the ear could be detected in the ear canal—otoacoustic emissions. The first commercial system for detecting and measuring otoacoustic emissions was produced in 1988.

== Auditory system ==
=== Components ===
The auditory system is composed of epithelial, osseous, vascular, neural and neocortical tissues. The anatomical divisions are external ear canal and tympanic membrane, middle ear, inner ear, VIII auditory nerve, and central auditory processing portions of the neocortex.

=== Hearing process ===
Sound waves enter the outer ear and travel through the external auditory canal until they reach the tympanic membrane, causing the membrane and the attached chain of auditory ossicles to vibrate. The motion of the stapes against the oval window sets up waves in the fluids of the cochlea, causing the basilar membrane to vibrate. This stimulates the sensory cells of the organ of Corti, atop the basilar membrane, to send nerve impulses to the central auditory processing areas of the brain, the auditory cortex, where sound is perceived and interpreted.

== Audiometric testing ==
- objectives: integrity, structure, function, freedom from infirmity.

=== Normative standards ===
- ISO 7029:2000 and BS 6951

== Types of audiometry ==
=== Subjective audiometry ===
Subjective audiometry requires the cooperation of the subject, and relies upon subjective responses which may both qualitative and quantitative, and involve attention (focus), reaction time, etc.

- Differential testing is conducted with a low frequency (usually 512 Hz) tuning fork. They are used to assess asymmetrical hearing and air/bone conduction differences. They are simple manual physical tests and do not result in an audiogram.
  - Weber test
  - Bing test
  - Rinne test
  - Schwabach test, a variant of the Rinne test
- Pure tone audiometry is a standardized hearing test in which air conduction hearing thresholds in decibels (db) for a set of fixed frequencies between 250 Hz and 8,000 Hz are plotted on an audiogram for each ear independently. A separate set of measurements is made for bone conduction. There is also high frequency Pure Tone Audiometry covering the frequency range above 8000 Hz to 16,000 Hz.
- Threshold equalizing noise (TEN) test
- Masking level difference (MLD) test
- Psychoacoustic (or psychophysical) tuning curve test
- Speech audiometry is a diagnostic hearing test designed to test word or speech recognition. It has become a fundamental tool in hearing-loss assessment. In conjunction with pure-tone audiometry, it can aid in determining the degree and type of hearing loss. Speech audiometry also provides information regarding discomfort or tolerance to speech stimuli and information on word recognition abilities. In addition, information gained by speech audiometry can help determine proper gain and maximum output of hearing aids and other amplifying devices for patients with significant hearing losses and help assess how well they hear in noise. Speech audiometry also facilitates audiological rehabilitation management.

Speech audiometry may include:

  - Speech awareness threshold
  - Speech recognition threshold
  - Suprathreshold word-recognition
  - Sentence testing
  - Dichotic listening test
  - Loudness levels determination
- Békésy audiometry, also called decay audiometry - audiometry in which the subject controls increases and decreases in intensity as the frequency of the stimulus is gradually changed so that the subject traces back and forth across the threshold of hearing over the frequency range of the test. The test is quick and reliable, so was frequently used in military and industrial contexts.
- Audiometry of children
  - Conditioned play audiometry
  - Behavioral observation audiometry
  - Visual reinforcement audiometry

=== Objective audiometry ===
Objective audiometry is based on physical, acoustic or electrophysiologic measurements and does not depend on the cooperation or subjective responses of the subject.

- Caloric stimulation/reflex test uses temperature difference between hot and cold water or air delivered into the ear to test for neural damage. Caloric stimulation of the ear results in rapid side-to-side eye movements called nystagmus. Absence of nystagmus may indicate auditory nerve damage. This test will often be done as part of another test called electronystagmography.
- Electronystagmography (ENG) uses skin electrodes and an electronic recording device to measure nystagmus evoked by procedures such as caloric stimulation of the ear
- Acoustic immittance audiometry - Immittance audiometry is an objective technique which evaluates middle ear function by three procedures: static immittance, tympanometry, and the measurement of acoustic reflex threshold sensitivity. Immittance audiometry is superior to pure tone audiometry in detecting middle ear pathology.
  - Tympanometry
  - Acoustic reflex thresholds
  - Acoustic reflectometry
  - wide-band absorbance audiometry also called 3D tympanometry
- Evoked potential audiometry
  - N1-P2 cortical audio evoked potential (CAEP) audiometry
  - ABR is a neurologic tests of auditory brainstem function in response to auditory (click) stimuli.
  - Electrocochleography a variant of ABR, tests the impulse transmission function of the cochlea in response to auditory (click) stimuli. It is most often used to detect endolymphatic hydrops in the diagnosis/assessment of Meniere's disease.
  - Audio steady state response (ASSR) audiometry
  - Vestibular evoked myogenic potential (VEMP) test, a variant of ABR that tests the integrity of the saccule
- Otoacoustic emission audiometry - this test can differentiate between the sensory and neural components of sensorineural hearing loss.
  - Distortion product otoacoustic emissions (DPOAE) audiometry
  - Transient evoked otoacoustic emissions (TEOAE) audiometry
  - Sustained frequency otoacoustic emissions (SFOAE) audiometry - At present, SFOAEs are not used clinically.
- In situ audiometry: a technique for measuring not only the condition of the person's auditory system, but also the characteristics of sound reproduction devices, in-the-canal hearing aids, vents and sound tubes of hearing aids.

== Audiograms ==
The result of most audiometry is an audiogram plotting some measured dimension of hearing, either graphically or tabularly.

The most common type of audiogram is the result of a pure tone audiometry hearing test which plots frequency versus amplitude sensitivity thresholds for each ear along with bone conduction thresholds at 8 standard frequencies from 250 Hz to 8000 Hz. A pure tone audiometry hearing test is the gold standard for evaluation of hearing loss or disability. Other types of hearing tests also generate graphs or tables of results that may be loosely called 'audiograms', but the term is universally used to refer to the result of a pure tone audiometry hearing test.

== Hearing assessment ==
Apart from testing hearing, part of the function of audiometry is in assessing or evaluating hearing from the test results. The most commonly used assessment of hearing is the determination of the threshold of audibility, i.e. the level of sound required to be just audible. This level can vary for an individual over a range of up to 5 decibels from day to day and from determination to determination, but it provides an additional and useful tool in monitoring the potential ill effects of exposure to noise. Hearing loss may be unilateral or bilateral, and bilateral hearing loss may not be symmetrical. The most common types of hearing loss, due to age and noise exposure, are usually bilateral and symmetrical.

In addition to the traditional audiometry, hearing assessment can be performed using a standard set of frequencies (audiogram) with mobile applications to detect possible hearing impairments.

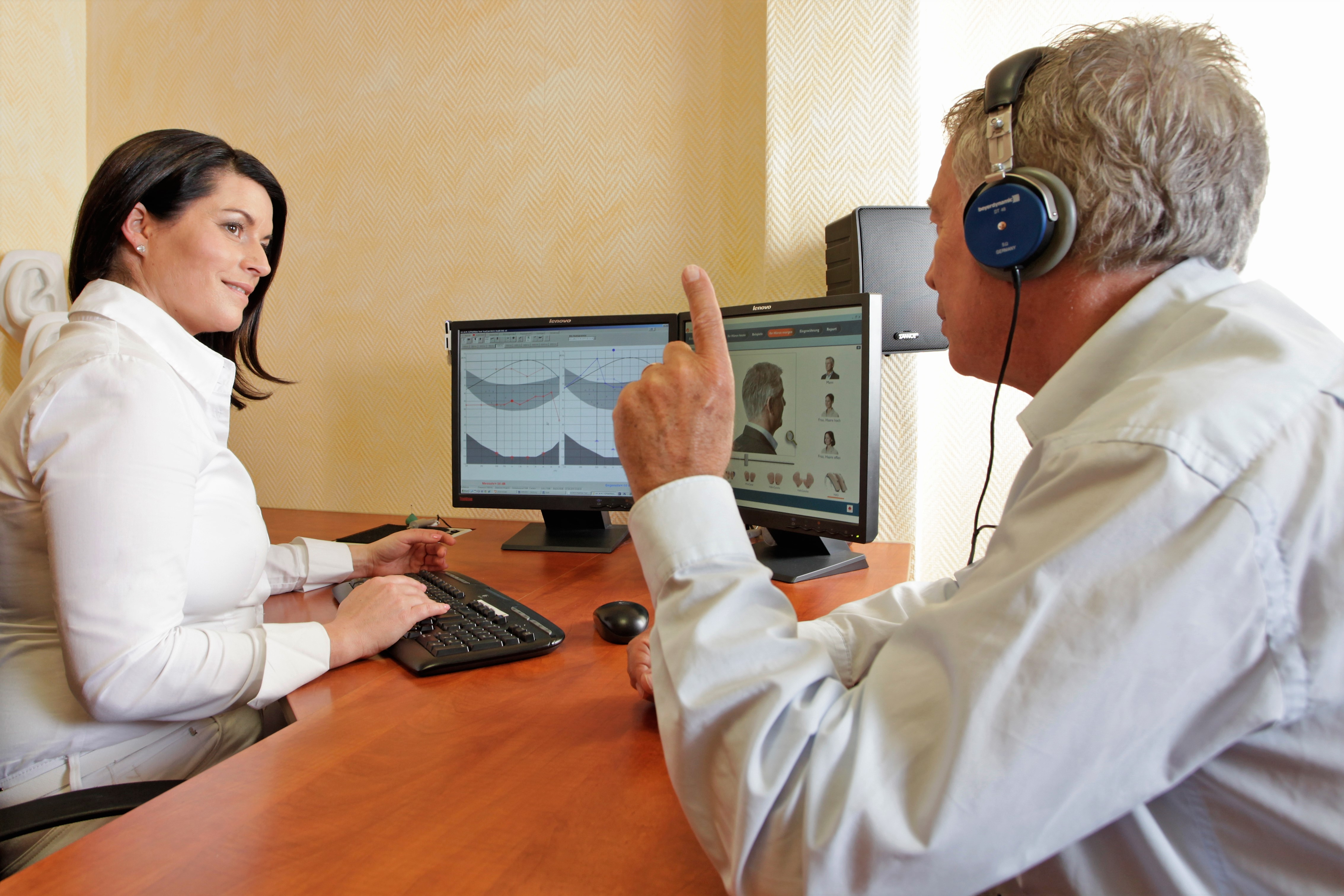
Hearing care professional performing a hearing test on a client, 2015

=== Hearing loss classification ===
The primary focus of audiometry is assessment of hearing status and hearing loss, including extent, type and configuration.

- There are four defined degrees of hearing loss: mild, moderate, severe and profound.
- Hearing loss may be divided into four types: conductive hearing loss, sensorineural hearing loss, central auditory processing disorders, and mixed types.
- Hearing loss may be unilateral or bilateral, of sudden onset or progressive, and temporary or permanent.

Hearing loss may be caused by a number of factors including heredity, congenital conditions, age-related (presbycusis) and acquired factors like noise-induced hearing loss, ototoxic chemicals and drugs, infections, and physical trauma.

== Clinical practice ==
Audiometric testing may be performed by a general practitioner medical doctor, an otolaryngologist (a specialized MD also called an ENT), a CCC-A (Certificate of Clinical Competence in Audiology) audiologist, a certified school audiometrist (a practitioner analogous to an optometrist who tests eyes), and sometimes other trained practitioners. Practitioners are certified by American Board of Audiology (ABA). Practitioners are licensed by various state boards regulating workplace health & safety, occupational professions, or ...

=== Noise-induced hearing loss ===
Workplace and environmental noise is the most prevalent cause of hearing loss in the United States and elsewhere.

== Research ==
- Computer modeling of patterns of hearing deficit
- 3D longitudinal profiles of hearing loss including age axis (presbycusis study)

== See also ==
- Hearing test
- American Academy of Audiology
- International Society of Audiology
- Weber test
- Rinne Test
- Visual reinforcement audiometry
