= Audiometrist =

Health professional who use pure tone audiometry equipment

An Audiometrist (from Latin audīre, "to hear"; and from Italian -metria, “to measure” ) or Audiometric Officer, is a health-care professional technician who has received special training in the use of Pure tone audiometry equipment. An audiometrist conducts hearing tests, or "audiometric screening", with an Audiometer to establish hearing levels. The results are represented by an audiogram, and are usually interpreted by an audiologist, or a registered Medical Officer, unless the audiometrist is also an audiologist, with the aim of diagnosing hearing loss.

There are currently some misconceptions regarding the definition of Audiometrist and Audiologist, which vary from country to country. These misconceptions continue to grow, in Australia in particular, which leads to the need for greater communication, less segregation of each other's role within the community and a broader understanding of each other's qualifications.

== Audiometrist vs. Audiologist ==
The word "Audiometrist" is derived from the word Audiometry, as distinct from Audiology. However, the title audiometrist is often used interchangeably with the role of audiologists, thereby making a precise definition of the word more difficult. Audiologists can therefore refer to themselves as audiometrists, although they still perform the tasks of audiologists. The origin of this cross-attribution is unclear, but may stem from the fact that many audiometrists also receive subsequent training in audiology, thereby making them both audiometrists and audiologists. Additionally, preferences for definitions of audiometrists are more varied worldwide, mainly because Audiometry education and licensing requirements vary from country to country, and the use or mis-use of the word in this fashion continues worldwide. A further role confusion arises because many audiometrists are involved directly in the hearing aid industry in an assistive capacity when they get in-house training for hearing aid audiometry, while others apply audiometry purely to Occupational Health. Since audiologists are more qualified, they can do the work of audiometrists, but not the other way round. This may often lead to the assumption that audiometrists are audiologists.

=== UK and Ireland ===
In the UK and Ireland Audiometrists generally differ from Audiologists in that they do not require or hold an Academic Degree or Doctorate in Audiology. Audiometrists are certified under the British and Irish Society of Hearing Aid Audiologists, the Health and Safety Executive (UK and Ireland) and the Health and Safety Authority (Ireland), and the time period of their training is generally shorter than audiologists. Unlike Audiologists, they are not licensed to treat hearing loss with the use of hearing aids.

=== Australia and New Zealand ===
As in the UK and Ireland, in Australia and New Zealand Audiometrists can receive certified training in audiometric screening. However, unlike the UK and Ireland, Audiometrists in Australia can prescribe hearing aids to treat a hearing loss if they complete the appropriate training.

An Audiometrist can choose to complete either a Certificate IV in Audiometric Assessment (available only as part of an apprenticeship) or a Diploma of Hearing Device Prescription and Evaluation. Only Audiometrists who complete the Diploma, and the further training below, are qualified to prescribe and fit hearing aids.

Upon graduation of their Diploma, Audiometrists must complete two years supervised clinical experience where they are closely supervised and monitored in a wide variety of techniques, this ensures a work ready condition. These range from paediatric assessment of clients aged from 3 years to assessment of elderly clients and cover all aspects of screening, diagnostic and prescriptive methods. After this time they are permitted to sit a stringent theoretical and practical exam before a panel of industry experts to be declared competent to prescribe and fit hearing aids. This is a requirement for an Audiometrist to be a member of a professional body. Audiometrists must also comply with a continuing education program which ensures maintenance of clinical skills as technology changes occur.

An Audiologist, who has completed a degree called "Master of Audiology", is required to complete twelve months of supervised clinical experience and be declared competent to be a member of a professional body. The undergraduate degree required prior to completing the Masters does not need to be science or medical based.

In Australia, the professional bodies for Audiometrists are: Australian College of Audiology (ACAud) – Audiologists and Audiometrists; and Hearing Aid Audiometrists Society of Australia (HAASA) – Audiometrists only.

Audiometrists providing services under the Australian Government Hearing Services Program must have appropriate membership of a professional body. This also applies to Audiologists.

While an Audiometrist can provide many of the same services as an Audiologist under the Australian Government Hearing Services Program, there are some diagnostic services that can only be provided by Audiologists. Other than referral to an Audiologist or ENT for these services, an Audiometrist does not require approval or supervision by an Audiologist. This does not apply to an Audiometrist with a Certificate IV qualification, who cannot provide unsupervised services under the Australian Government Hearing Services Program. There is a Scope of Practice document that delineates the areas of the profession. The Scope of Practice is regularly updated. All members of the three professional bodies are referable to a central Ethics Review organisation ( ERC).

=== U.S. and Canada ===
In the United States and Canada, Audiometrists, sometimes referred to as "Audiometric Technicians", also receive accreditation in audiometric screening, under the Occupational Safety and Health Administration (OSHA)and Master of Healthcare Administration (MHA). When audiometry is applied to industry, audiometrists are sometimes also called Occupational Hearing Conservationists. When Audiometrists become qualified as Audiologists, they are more commonly referred to as Hearing Instrument Specialists, and are licensed hearing professionals that perform diagnostic hearing evaluations, as well as prescribe and fit hearing aids. A Hearing Instrument Specialist in the US or Canada is the equivalent of a Hearing Aid Dispenser in the UK or Ireland.

== See also ==
- Hearing
- Audiometry
- Audiometer
- Audiogram
- Audiologist
- Audiology
- Hearing test
- Hearing loss
- Occupational Health
