= Cartilage conduction =

Pathway by which sound signals are transmitted to the inner ear

Cartilage conduction is a pathway by which sound signals are transmitted to the inner ear. In 2004, Hiroshi Hosoi (Nara Medical University) discovered this pathway and named it “cartilage conduction”. Hearing by cartilage conduction is distinct from conventional sound-conduction pathways, such as air or bone, because it is realized by touching a transducer on the aural cartilage and does not involve the vibration of the skull bone. Therefore, cartilage conduction is referred to as the “third auditory pathway”.

== Overview ==
Since approximately 450 years ago, two pathways have been acknowledged for transmitting sound to the inner ear: air conduction and bone conduction. In 2004, Hiroshi Hosoi, then a professor at Nara Medical University (and currently its president), discovered the phenomenon of hearing by cartilage vibration of the outer ear. By attaching a vibrator to the aural cartilage, sound was found to be transmitted into the inner ear well. He proposed the novel concept that the cartilage has a unique property that makes it capable of transmitting sound. The new pathway was referred to as cartilage conduction. As of December 2022, 32 academic papers have been published on this topic in international scientific journals. Moreover, cartilage-conduction hearing aids, earphones and sound collectors have been on the market since 2017, 2022 and 2023, respectively.

== Shaping of the ear by bone and cartilage ==
The peripheral auditory organ consists of the outer, middle, and inner (cochlea) ear. The outer ear consists of the pinna and external auditory external canal. The pinna is shaped by cartilage. The outer and inner halves of the external auditory canal are shaped by cartilage and bone, respectively. The cartilage part and bony part can be differentiated through gentle pressure by a finger. When a transducer is placed on the cartilage part, sound can be heard via cartilage conduction. A suitable contact position for effective conduction is the cartilage around the entrance of the external auditory canal, whereas parts more distant from the entrance (e.g., the crus helicis) are less likely to be involved in cartilage conduction.

== Hearing mechanism of a normal ear ==
The cartilage-conduction pathway can be understood by comparison with air and bone conduction.

Air conduction: Sound propagated from a sound source through the air is received by the outer ear, and then transmitted via the ear drum, middle ear, and inner ear. Bone conduction: Sound from a vibrator oscillates the skull bone, and the vibration is transmitted directly to the inner ear without passing through the ear drum and middle ear.

Cartilage conduction: Sound from a vibrator oscillates the aural cartilage, and the generated sound in an external auditory canal is transmitted via the ear drum, middle ear, and inner ear. In this case, the cartilage part of the external auditory canal plays the roles of a diaphragm of a loudspeaker. Therefore, the sound is generated in the cylindrical external auditory canal of the person who use cartilage conduction sound device.

Cartilage conduction is different from air conduction because the sound source is in the external auditory canal, and is different from bone conduction because it does not require the vibration of the skull bone.

== History of cartilage conduction ==
- In 2004, cartilage conduction was discovered by Professor Hiroshi Hosoi at Nara Medical University.
- Nara Medical University conducted clinical research studies of hearing aids based on the cartilage conduction, leading to the world's first cartilage conduction hearing aid (Rion Co., Ltd.), which was launched on the Japanese market in 2017. This hearing aid has been distributed for patients with atresia of the external auditory canal.
- In 2021, a special issue on “Bone and cartilage conduction” was published in the academic journal Audiology Research,. As of December, 2022, 32 academic papers were published in international academic journals.
- In 2021, transducers specialized for cartilage conduction were released by CCH Sound, Inc.. Several other companies have plans to manufacture cartilage conduction acoustic products using the transducers.
- In 2022, a wireless cartilage conduction headphones using patents held by CCH sound Corp were released by audio-technica Corp.
- In 2023, sound collector and headphone consulted by CCH sound Corp were released by TRA Corp in Japan.
- In 2023, for smooth communication with hearing-impaired persons over the counter’s window, cartilage conduction earphones were distributed in Japanese public facilities.

== Superiority to air-conduction devices ==
Sources:

- In contrast with canal-type earphones, cartilage-conduction earphones can be used without occluding the external auditory canal, so the user does not hear their own chewing and does not receive a feeling of fullness in the ear.
- Cartilage-conduction earphones have less sound leakage than open-fitting earphones (earphones with air vent).
- The output volume of the sound conducted via the cartilage can be varied by adjusting the application force on the outer ear, which can be achieved using a smart phone.
- The transducer can be placed on the frame of glasses, whereby the sound conducted via the cartilage is generated by oscillating behind the ears.
- When the transducer is placed on a finger ring, sound is audible by attaching the finger to the ear cartilage.
- The cartilage-conduction transducer is usable at the depth of the water 4 m.
- The cartilage conduction transducer is more sanitary than earphones which have an ear piece that may become filled by sebum. Since the cartilage conduction transducer is not inserted into the external auditory canal, it does not cause external otitis and fungal external otitis. The cartilage-conduction transducer can also be designed freely, so it can be applied to accessories (e.g., Sound Jewelry).

== Superiority to bone-conduction devices ==
Sources:

- Because bone conduction requires strong vibration to oscillate the heavy skull bone, the transducer consumes considerable electrical power and propagates unnecessary sound into the surroundings. Because the transducer has to be pressed on the user's mastoid with a force of more than 1 N, long-term use can also cause skin irritation, long-lasting depressions in the skin, and discomfort. By contrast, a cartilage-conduction transducer, which oscillates the light aural cartilage, can be placed gently on the outer ear.
- A bone-conduction device cannot produce appropriate time and intensity gaps between the left and right ears when used binaurally. For this reason, it is difficult to receive a stereophonic effect. By contrast, a cartilage-conduction device can produce sound independently in the left and right ears, thereby enabling sound localization.
- In one clinical research study, 39 of 41 participants who had been using a bone-conduction hearing aid switched to a cartilage-conduction hearing aid.

== Practical tools that use cartilage conduction ==
1) Hearing aids / Sound collector

Cartilage conduction can be useful for patients with disorders of the outer ear, including aural atresia (underdeveloped ear canal), where conventional air-conduction hearing aids cannot be used. The basic premise of cartilage-conduction hearing aids is that cartilage located outside the ear canal is vibrated, which allows the vibration to be transmitted despite the presence of any outer ear disorders. Because hearing contributes to language development, cartilage-conduction hearing aids would be particularly beneficial to children with disorders of the outer ear. In addition to basic research, clinical studies of cartilage-conduction hearing aids have commenced in the USA (University of Michigan) and Indonesia (University of Indonesia). In 2023, the cartilage conduction sound collector was released by the TRA company in Japan. This sound collector has merits that the washable transducer can be kept in sanitary condition, and it does not cause the uncomfortable feeling of fullness in ears and chewing sound.

2) Smartphones

In 2012, a smartphone prototype that uses cartilage conduction was manufactured by ROHM Co., Ltd. and published in the Japanese Society of Otorhinolaryngology-Head and Neck Surgery. This smartphone provides clearer sound than conventional phones, even under noisy conditions. Furthermore, the sound pressure level can be easily modified by adjusting the pressure of the smartphone against the outer ear. Importantly, sound leakage or "bleeding" is minimized, resulting in those around the user being far less able to hear the phone call. In addition, less oil and dirt is transferred to the smartphone's surface owing to the smaller contact area against the user's face. The cartilage-conduction phone can also be used with conventional air-conduction hearing aids.

3) Earphones

The ear canal does not have to be physically occluded by an earphone that operates via cartilage conduction. As such, this type of earphone does not reduce situational awareness, as users can still hear sounds from the environment around them. Similar to cartilage-conduction smartphones, very little sound leaks from this type of earphone. The first cartilage-conduction earphone came onto the market in 2022. The current communication income fills one side of ears, and the user hears the environmental sound in the opposite free ear. While the cartilage conduction transducers enable both ears to hear the transmitted speech and the environmental sounds at the same time, because they do not occlude the ears. And they can present spatial sound, so they are suitable for security and operation in a large space.

4) Earphones to communicate through windows at counters

The cartilage conduction earphones help the hearing of hearing-impaired people for smooth communications over the counters of city offices and banks. Conventional earphones have ear pieces that may be filled by sebum, so are unsuitable for the public use. The cartilage conduction transducer can be designed in a smooth and even shape (e.g., ball and disc) and can be kept clean by wiping. In Japan, the cartilage conduction earphones have been distributed in the counters of public spaces.

5) Hearing devices integrated in glasses

A transducer can be embedded in the frame of glasses, oscillating behind the ears and presenting sound via cartilage conduction without needing to occlude the ear canal with earphones. In addition, this device is not noticeable to others. This system can be applied for smart glasses, telephone glasses, and glasses-based hearing aids (or sound collectors).

6) Wristwatch smartphones

A user wearing this wristwatch can communicate with the people at the other end of the line simply by placing their fingers on their ears.

7) Communication robots

Cartilage conduction has been considered for communicating with robots. Currently, loudspeaker systems are used to convey sounds produced by robots. However, such loudspeakers generate loud noises in a room filled with many robots that simultaneously emit speech sounds. A human-to-robot communication system is needed to overcome this problem. Cartilage conduction can realize better communication than a loudspeaker system for communicating with robots.

8) Underwater communication

Because the transducer on the outer ear can transmit clear sound even under the water, cartilage conduction is useful for underwater communication. Cartilage-conduction transducers are usable at depths of 4 m below the water surface.

9) Audible accessories

Cartilage-conduction transducers can be designed in many shapes (e.g., disk and ball), which presents opportunities in the fashion and jewelry industries (e.g., cartilage-conduction earrings and sound jewelry).

== Consortium for cartilage-conduction technologies ==
In June 2022, a consortium was established to facilitate the adoption of cartilage-conduction technologies globally. Twenty-seven full-membership companies and 16 newsletter-membership companies participate in the consortium (as of January 2023).
