= Conditioned play audiometry =

Conditioned play audiometry (CPA) is a type of audiometry done in children from ages 2 to 5 years old, in developmental age. It is the test that directly follows visual reinforcement audiometry when the child becomes able to focus on a task. It is a type of behavioral hearing test, of which there are many.

Conditioned play audiometry uses toys to direct the child's attention to the listening task and turns it into a game. Instead of raising one's hand in response to the sound, as an adult would, the child might drop a toy into a bucket every time he or she hears a sound. This keeps the child interested in the listening task for longer. Common games include dropping balls in buckets, placing rings on a stick, feeding coins in a play pig, among many others.

The first part of CPA involves conditioning the child. The audiologist presents a loud sound that the child can comfortably hear, while encouraging the child to "drop the ball in the bucket every time you hear the sound," or whichever game is being used. After a few trials to get the child comfortable with the task, the audiologist then attempts to drop to low levels in order to find the softest sound the child can hear. It's incredibly important to go quickly to ensure the child does not lose attention to the task.

There are precautions to take to ensure good reliability when performing solo play audiometry. It is important that the child not react to the clinician's hand movements, instead of sounds themselves. To address this, false taps on the tablet are essential to ensure the child is abiding by the listening task and not visual cues. Should the child react to non-sound producing (false) taps, re-conditioning may be warranted.

Just like typical audiometry, CPA is performed at multiple frequencies, from 250 to 8000 Hz, to get a full range of the child's hearing. This can be performed using typical headphones and with a bone oscillator, and all thresholds are plotted on an audiogram. Once the child has reached approximately five years old, conventional audiometry using a button or hand-raising can typically be performed.
