= Mixed hearing loss =

Sensorineural & conductive hearing loss

Mixed hearing loss is a combination of conductive and sensorineural hearing loss.

== Description ==
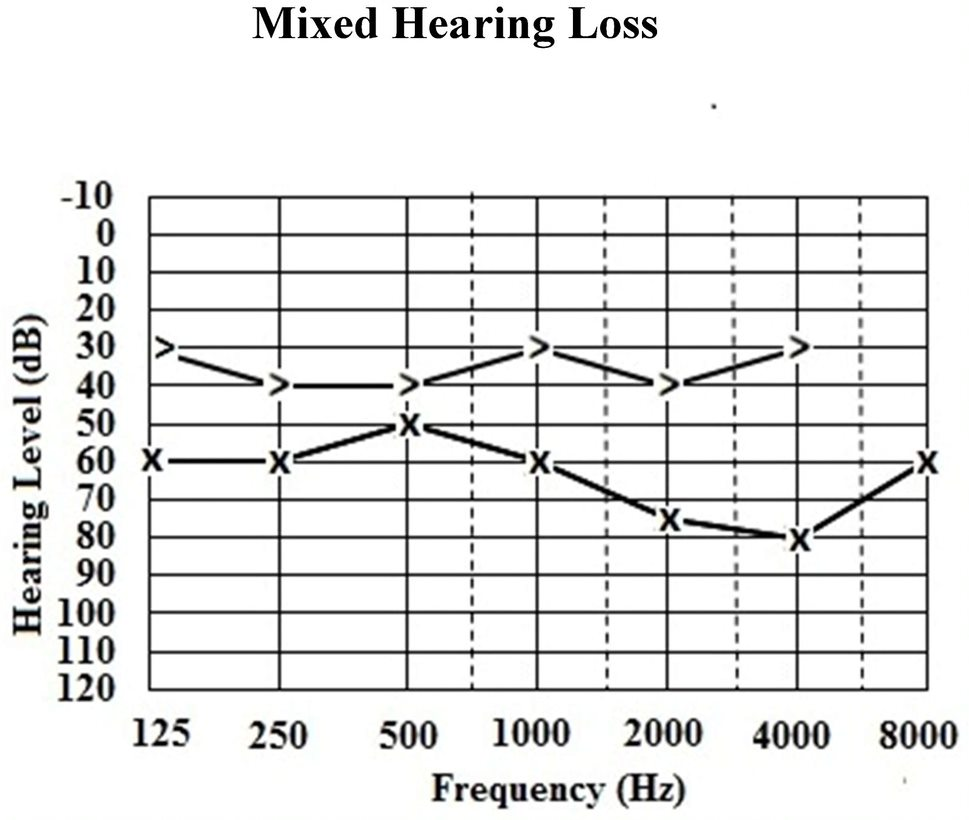
An audiogram showing mixed hearing loss in the left ear.

Conductive hearing loss occurs when sounds can no longer move from the outer and middle ear to the inner ear.

Sensorineural hearing loss occurs when the inner ear or its associated nerve pathways cannot send sounds to the brain.

Mixed hearing loss is when both occur simultaneously.

== Treatment ==
Rehabilitation options for the disorder are increasingly diversifying. Options include strategies where the inner ear is coupled to the outer ear, along with conventional hearing aids and bone-conduction implants.
