= Bone conduction auditory brainstem response =

- Purpose: records neural response from EEG

Bone-conduction auditory brainstem response or BCABR is a type of auditory evoked response that records neural response from EEG with stimulus transmitted through bone conduction.

== Types of bone conduction ==
Vibration of the skull results in auditory sensation. This is a way to somewhat bypass the outer and middle ears to stimulate the cochlea. Von Bekesy is credited with the discovery that at the level of the cochlea, phase shifted bone-conduction signals cancel out air conduction signals. Bone-conduction works because all of the bones of the skull are connected, including the temporal bone, which in turn stimulates the cochlea. Barany (1938) and Herzog & Krainz (1926) were some of the first researchers to examine the different components of bone-conduction hearing. Tonndorf (1968) found that there are three different forces that contribute to the forces needed to stimulate the cochlea: Distortional, Inertial (Ossicular), and External canal (Osseotympanic)

=== Distortional bone-conduction ===
As vibrations compress the bones of the skull, pressure is put on the otic capsule and the membranous labyrinth. This then compresses the scala vestibule into the basilar membrane in the direction toward the scala tympani. A traveling wave is created similar to that created by air conduction signals.

=== Inertial bone-conduction ===
The ossicles are suspended in the head and loosely coupled to the skull. When the head moves, the ossicles move out of phase with the head, but still follow the same cyclic motion. This causes the stapes to move in and out of the oval window. When vibrations come from the mastoid, inertial bone-conduction is greatest below 800 Hz. Putting the bone vibrator on the forehead instead of the mastoid does not significantly create this affect.

=== Osseotympanic bone-conduction ===
This type of bone-conduction also involves low frequencies. As a bone vibrator vibrates the skull, the bone and cartilage of the external ear receives energy, most of which escapes the unoccluded ear. Some of this energy hits the tympanic membrane and combines with inertial bone-conduction, stimulating the inner ear. An example of this occurs when you close your ears and speak- your voice appears to be much lower in frequency.

== Bone-conduction ABR ==
Bone-conduction auditory brainstem response (BCABR) are similar to air conduction auditory brainstem responses, with the main difference being that the signal is transmitted via bone-conduction instead of air. The goal of bone ABR is to estimate cochlear function and to help identify the type of hearing loss present. Responses to air and bone-conduction ABRs are compared (for the same intensity and stimuli).

Techniques and results for bone-conduction auditory brainstem responses are presented in a review chapter by Stapells, as well as in a detailed assessment protocol by the British Columbia Early Hearing Program (BCEHP).

=== When is BCABR needed? ===
Any infant showing elevated ABR thresholds to air-conduction stimuli should be tested using bone-conduction stimuli. Atresia, microtia, otitis media and other outer/middle ear abnormalities, as well as infants with sensorineural hearing loss, will require the use of bone-conduction ABR testing. Infants who have a considerable amount of amniotic fluid in their middle ear space may need to be tested with BCABR. This fluid usually disappears by 48 hours after birth.

=== Problems with BCABR ===
It is very common for there to be a large amount of artifact while using bone-conduction ABR. This is especially true at high intensities (~50 dB nHL) and at earlier waves (i.e. Wave I). To avoid stimulus artifact, it is recommended that the bone oscillator be placed high on the temporal bone and that the inverting electrode is placed on the earlobe, mastoid, or nape of the neck. Using an alternating phase stimuli should be used to reduce artifact. Since the output of most bone oscillators is around 45 to 55 dB nHL, it becomes difficult to distinguish between sensorineural or mixed hearing losses when the losses by bone exceed this number. This output limitation of the bone oscillator is a drawback.

=== BCABR responses ===
With Bone ABR, the waves are typically more rounded that with traditional auditory brainstem response. The maximum output for bone is around 50 dB nHL and should look similar to the 50 dB HL response of air conduction for people with normal hearing or with a mild SNHL. With conductive hearing losses, the latencies for air are shifted when compared to the latencies of bone-conduction.

Mauldin & Jerger (1979) found that for adults, the Wave V latencies derived from bone-conduction ABR are approximately 0.5 ms longer than the same intensity level of air conduction. For infants, Wave V latencies for bone-conduction clicks are shorter than the air conduction clicks. These differences can be attributed to changes to the skull due to aging.

== BCABR with tone bursts ==
As with air-conduction stimuli, thresholds for bone-conduction stimuli should be obtained using tone burst stimuli Stapells is one researcher who reported on the accuracy of using tone bursts with BC ABR to estimate cochlear hearing sensitivity. Stapells and Ruben, in 1989, demonstrated bone-conduction tone burst ABRs in infants with conductive hearing loss. Hatton, Janssen and Stapells (2012) present bone-conduction tone burst ABR results in infants with normal bone-conduction thresholds or sensorineural hearing loss. BC ABR methods are described in 2010 review chapter by Stapells.

=== Physiology ===
Wegel and Lane found that low-frequencies masked high-frequencies better than the highs mask the lows. This is explained by von Bekesy's findings that the cochlea has an asymmetrical filter function effect. This asymmetry and higher travelling wave velocity at the base explains why the ABR is biased towards the high frequencies. For a low-frequency tone burst, the travelling wave velocity is greatest at the base than at the apex. For low frequency tone bursts, the displacement is largest in the apex. The neural response is synchronous only over a short distance of the apex. The response is broader due to lack of neural synchrony. High intensity tone bursts stimulate more of the basal areas. Tone burst masking techniques have been developed to overcome this upward spread of masking.

Click stimuli have no frequency specificity, thus it is not possible to know which frequencies specifically contribute to a click threshold. tonal stimuli are required to obtain frequency-specific thresholds. An ideal tone burst has energy at a pure-tone frequency (e.g. 2000 Hz) regardless of the intensity. This tone burst would stimulate the corresponding area on the basilar membrane. However, if a tone burst is too short in duration, it could cause spectral splatter and lose its frequency selectivity. Tone bursts approximately 5 cycles in duration appear to be acceptable.

Nevertheless, due to normal cochlear function, any tonal stimulus (even continuous long-duration tones), presented at high intensity levels, will result in stimulation of higher frequency cochlear regions ("upward spread of excitation").

=== Polarity ===
Stapells recommends using alternating polarity to reduce stimulus artifact, especially with tone burst stimuli. (Contrary to some suggestions, there is no evidence that thresholds for single-polarity tone bursts (e.g., rarefaction) are better than those to alternating polarity.

For some high intensity tone bursts, especially 500–1000 Hz, single (e.g., rarefaction) polarity results in very large amplitude stimulus artifact, making it difficult to distinguish waves from artifact. Using an alternating polarity helps to revert the ABR back to typical looking waveforms.

Rarefaction polarity is recommended for clicks.

=== Effectiveness ===
- Tone burst stimuli are clinically possible and straightforward to conduct.
- There is wide support that shows that low to moderate intensity levels do produce frequency-specific responses.
- Research has shown that although tone bursts with linear onset and offset characteristics may produce spectral splatter, this can be reduced with the use of non-linear stimulus shaping envelopes.

== See also ==
- Auditory brainstem response
- Bone conduction
- Cochlea
- Middle ear
- Tone burst
