= Girolamo Capivaccio =

Italian physician (1523–1589)

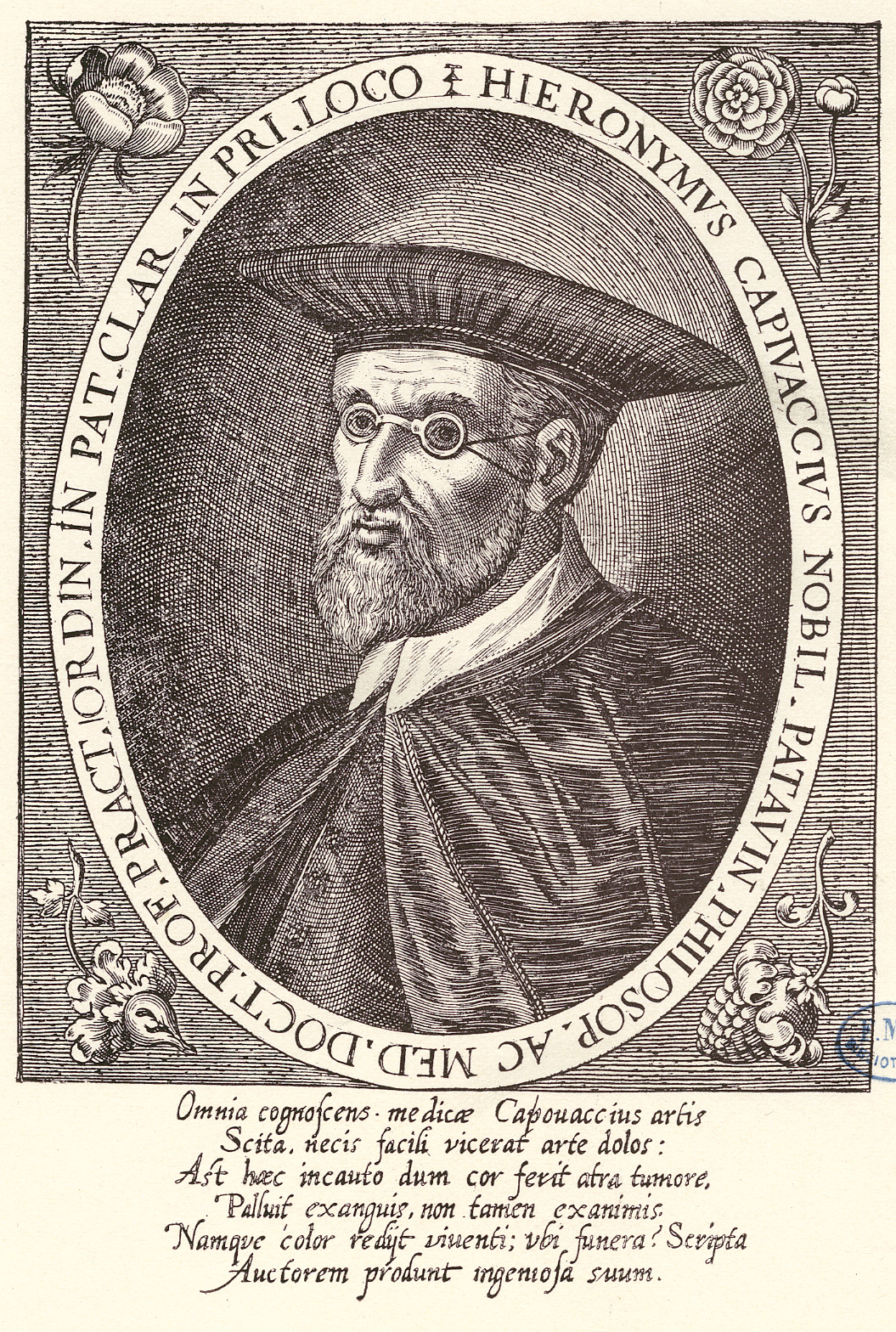
- Born: 1523; Padua
- Died: 1589 (aged 65–66); Mantua
- Other names: Hieronymus Capivacceus; Capodivacca
- Occupations: physician; professor; author

Academic background
- Education: Studium of Padua

Academic work
- Discipline: medicine
- Institutions: University of Padua
- Notable works: Methodus practicae medicinae omnium corporis humani affectuum causas, signa et curationes exibens

Girolamo Capivaccio (Latinized as Hieronymus Capivacceus; also known as Capodivacca; 1523–1589) was an Italian physician, professor of medicine at the University of Padua, and medical author of the Renaissance period.

He was known for his extensive teaching career in Padua and his writings on practical medicine, particularly on venereal disease and general therapeutics. Many of his works were published posthumously and are preserved today in rare book collections, including that of the New York University College of Dentistry. His works were influential in the tradition of Renaissance medical teaching and reflect a blend of Galenic philosophy and systematic clinical description.

== Biography ==
Capivaccio was born in Padua in 1523 into a noble family and studied medicine at the Studium of Padua (now the University of Padua). He earned his medical degree in 1552 at about age 29, shortly after the time of the anatomist Andreas Vesalius. Following his degree, he remained at Padua and began a long academic career. In 1553 he was appointed to a teaching chair in practical medicine (medicina practica) and later advanced to full professor, where he taught for several decades and became well regarded as a teacher.

Capivaccio developed a reputation as a specialist in difficult medical cases, particularly venereal disease (lues venerea), then a pressing public health issue across Europe. According to contemporary accounts, he was reputed (perhaps apocryphally) to have unique insights into treatment; when asked for the secret of his success he is said to have replied, “Lege methodum meam, et habebis mea secreta” (“Read my method and you will have my secrets”).

In 1576, Capivaccio and his colleague Girolamo Mercuriale were called to Venice by the Senate during a severe epidemic to assess the disease and its causes. They concluded it was not a contagious pestilence in the strict sense.

Capivaccio died in 1589 in Mantua, where he had traveled to treat a patient; he was first buried in the old Jesuit church and later reinterred in the church of Santa Maria Maddalena.

== Work and influence ==
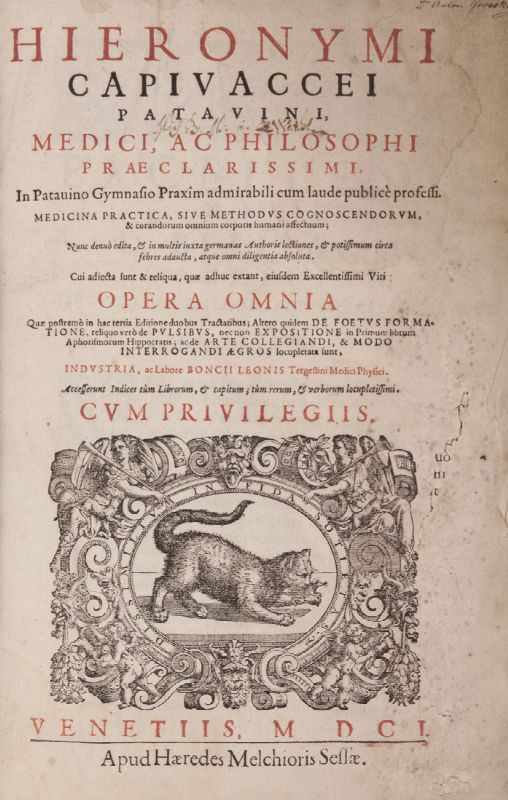
Medicina practica, sive methodus cognoscendorum, et curandorum omnium corporis humani affectuum (Practical medicine, or the method to diagnose and treat all human afflictions), 1601 edition.

=== Preservation and rare books ===
Original editions of Capivaccio’s works are held in rare book collections around the world. The New York University College of Dentistry's rare book library lists Capivaccio among the 16th-century medical authors in its holdings; the collection catalogs note his education in Padua and place him in the context of Renaissance anatomy and clinical practice alongside contemporaries such as Vesalius.

=== Selected publications ===
Capivaccio's writings were part of the medical curriculum in Italian universities of the late sixteenth and early seventeenth centuries. His major works include:

- Opusculum de doctrinarum differentiis, seu de Methodis (1562) — a treatise on medical logic and method that outlined theoretical distinctions useful in diagnosing and treating disease.
- Methodus practicae medicinae omnium corporis humani affectuum causas, signa et curationes exibens — a comprehensive treatise on practical medicine detailing disease causes, signs, and treatments, first published in Venice in 1591 and subsequently reprinted in 1594 and 1597, and with other works in 1591, 1594, and 1601. It was also published in Frankfurt in 1594 and Lyon in 1597.
- Acroases de virulentia gallica seu de lue venerea — a tract on venereal disease published around 1590, reflecting contemporary understanding and therapeutic approaches to the condition.

Posthumous collected editions of his works, such as Opera omnia , were published in Italy and Germany, early 1600s.
