= Magistrato alla Sanità =

Office of the Republic of Venice

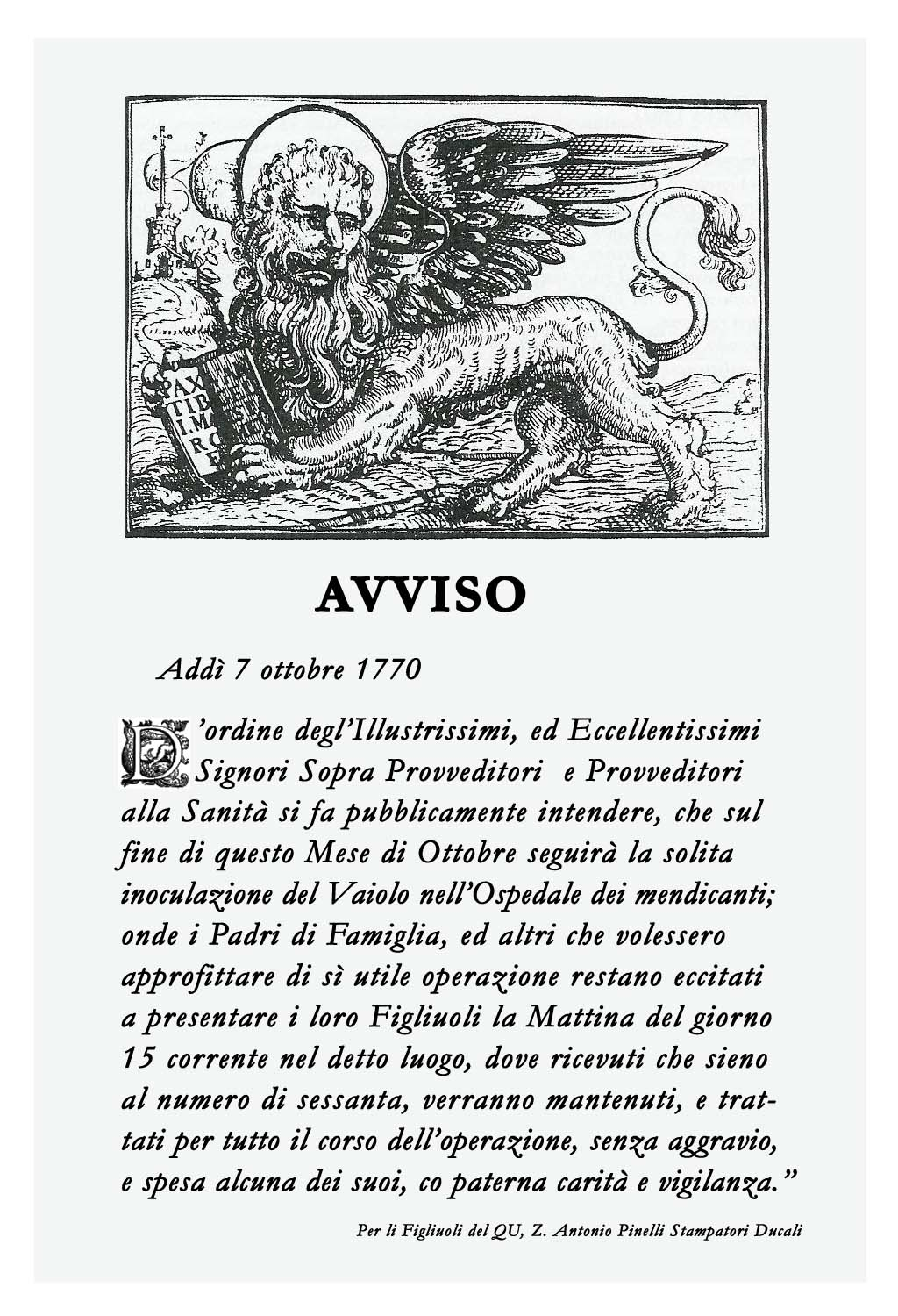
Notice of the Magistrato alla Sanità, dated 7 October 1770, announcing the availability of smallpox variolation for children, at government expense

The Magistrato alla Sanità (English: "Magistracy of Health") was the office of the Republic of Venice definitively instituted in 1490 to manage public health in the city of Venice and its territories, with specific attention on preventing the spread of epidemics within the maritime republic. The magistracy was among the first health authorities in Europe to institute public inoculation projects to prevent the spread of infectious diseases.

Initially composed of three nobles, the magistracy was expanded in 1556 when two nobles were nominated in a supervisory role. The office of the Magistrato alla Sanità was retained until the Fall of the Republic of Venice, during which it was briefly replaced by a health committee and eventually superseded by other magistracies entirely.

== Organisation ==
In the Venetian government, the term 'magistrato' normally referred to a complex magistracy that was formed by the aggregation of individual committees. These could act together but, each having autonomous functions, also separately, at times with reciprocal control functions. The Magistrato alla Sanità was composed of two different committees and consisted in five nobles: the three provveditori alla sanità (superintendents of health) and the two sopraprovveditori alla sanità (supervisors of health). Supernumerary sopraprovveditori, with limited terms, could also be nominated by the Senate to investigate specific health-related matters. In addition, beginning in 1598, a provveditore generale per la peste (general superintendent for the plague) was designated during epidemics to control large geographical areas of the republic and coordinate containment efforts.

=== Provveditori alla Sanità ===
==== Origin ====
Venice's commercial dealings with vessels coming from other Mediterranean ports made the city particularly susceptible to foreign diseases; it was consequently one of the early urban centres in Europe to be devastated by the Black Death, the outbreak of the plague in 1347. It was in response to this outbreak that the Great Council first created a temporary committee of public health on 30 March 1348. Yet given the limited knowledge of the causes of the disease at the time and the resulting inability to enact adequate containment measures, the committee was largely tasked with the removal and burial of the highly contagious corpses.

Beginning in 1423, the authority to determine the most efficient means to contain and eradicate frequent infections and to coordinate efforts between various government offices was completely delegated to the Full College, the executive committee of the Senate. However, given the numerous duties of the Full College, ad hoc commissions had to be created during the epidemics of 1459, 1460, and 1468 in order to effectively deal with the health crises. Despite the need for a permanent committee of public health, there was resistance from other government offices whose own authority would be diminished, primarily on the part of the Salt Office whose tax revenues, derived from the government monopoly of the salt trade, largely financed the lazarets, used for quarantine on islands away from the city. Additional resistance to empowering a permanent government office stemmed from commercial interests which would be affected by the imposition of quarantine on ships and their cargo. Nevertheless, a dedicated committee, the three provveditori alla sanità, was established by the Senate on 7 January 1486 (Venetian year 1485) to defend the city from the second major outbreak of the plague. At the conclusion of its twelve-month term, the committee was not renewed, and more delays ensued until 9 January 1490 (Venetian year 1489) when the provveditori were definitively established.

==== Election and term ====
The provveditori alla sanità were initially a magistratura senatoriale (senatorial magistracy), a standing committee elected by the Senate from among its own members. But legislation on 9 November 1537 assigned the election of the provveditori to the Great Council. They were henceforth chosen from among the broader ruling patrician class and were aggregated to the Senate as an external committee with authority to propose legislation concerning health matters but without vote. They were consequently classified as sottopregadi, literally beneath pregadi, in reference to pregadi, the alternative title of the senators. (Note: The name Senate, of classical derivation, began to be used in the Renaissance. The early name of the assembly was the Consiglio dei Pregadi (Council of pregadi) since the members were pregadi ('prayed', invited) to attend. See Besta, Il senato veneziano..., p. 20 and Da Mosto, L'Archivio di Stato di Venezia..., p. 34.) (Note: The sottopregadi were subdivided into three classes, termed lochi, on the basis of their importance, the three provveditori alla sanità being assigned to the second loco. To be eligible for election as provveditore alla sanità it was required that the individual have already served in an office belonging to the first (inferior) loco. See Maranini, La Costituzione di Venezia, II, p. 171.) The provveditori were exonerated from the obligation to actually take part in the meetings of the Senate during their tenure, due to the need to manage urgent health-related matters. At the conclusion of their term of office, they sat in the Senate in an advisory capacity for a period equivalent to their term, initially one year but extended to sixteen months in 1745. The reform of 1745 also granted the provveditori the right to vote in the Senate.

=== Sopraprovveditori alla Sanità ===
==== Origin ====
The inferior hierarchical position of the provveditori alla sanità, below senatorial dignity, limited their ability both to interact with higher-ranking offices throughout the government and to enforce the norms and directives aimed at safeguarding public health, particularly in the territories subject to Venice on the Italian mainland and overseas. This deficiency was increasingly problematic as the responsibilities of the office were increased, and it became acute during epidemics. Hence in 1556, at the first signs of a new outbreak of pestilence, the Senate had to compensate for the relative lack of authority of the provveditori by intervening directly to organize the necessary countermeasures. Later that same year, the Senate created a temporary committee to direct the work of the provveditori in the name of the republic. Similar temporary committees were created during later outbreaks of the plague until 1646 when the two sopraprovveditori alla sanità were established as a permanent committee. Together with the provveditori, they formed the Magistrato alla Sanità. Their principal role was to coordinate with other magistracies. They also had the full authority of the Senate to enforce the public health measures of the Magistrato alla Sanità throughout the territories of the republic.

==== Election and term ====
When the office was made permanent in 1646, the sopraprovveditori alla sanità were designated as a magistratura senatoriale: they were chosen by the Senate from among its own members. Legislation on 9 December 1674 further defined the sopraprovveditori alla sanità as a magistratura serrata (closed magistracy): they could not be elected to an alternative committee until the end of their term, the objective being to ensure that they had sufficient time to gain practical experience in dealing with the complex and critical matters of public health. The term of office, initially six months, was extended to one year in 1667.

== Functions ==
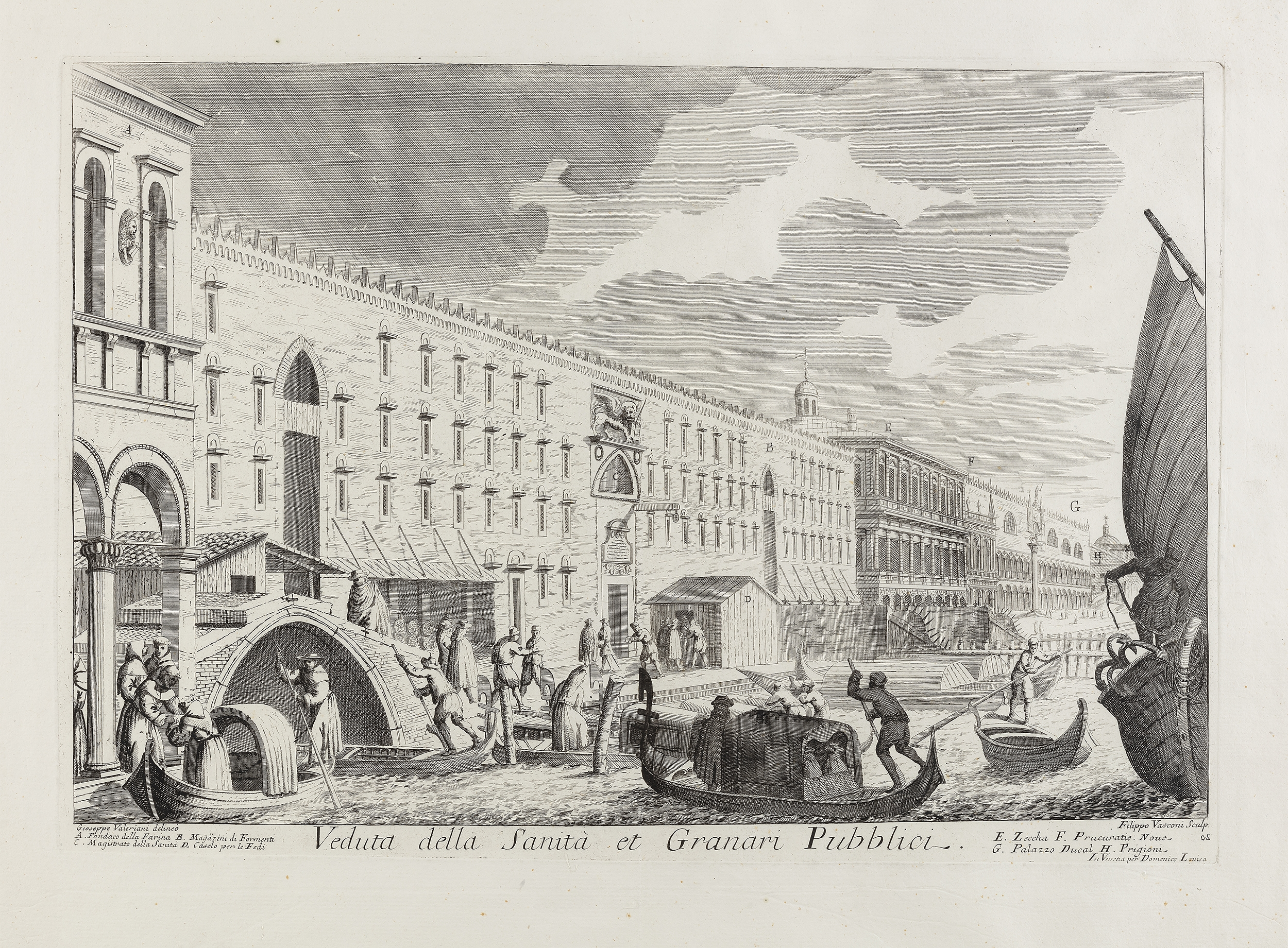
Domenico Lovisa, "Veduta della Sanità et Granari Pubblici". From the office of the Magistrato alla Sanità, inside the public granary near Saint Mark's Square, it was possible to sight arriving ships and inspect for disease.

Upon its institution as a permanent body, the provveditori alla sanità were tasked with safeguarding the public health of the state, with particular attention to preventing the spread of foreign diseases within the republic's territory, a regular threat for a city with an extensive reliance on international trade routes that facilitated contagion. From the offices of the magistracy, inside the public granaries near Saint Mark’s Square, it was possible to control the arrival of all ships and to prevent the disembarking of passengers and the unloading of cargo until health inspections were conducted. Upon sighting the arrival of a ship into port, observers of the magistracy, stationed in the nearby bell tower, immediately notified the magistracy so that health officials could be sent to conduct inspections. All travelers, merchants, sailors, or pilgrims, had to obtain permission to enter the city. Suspected individuals and cargo were redirected to the lazarets for quarantine.

In order to enable control and quarantine of disease outbreaks, officials of the Magistrato alla Sanità were able to impose periods of isolation of at least 14 days, upper length dependent on the situation in the port of question, and to cordon off areas of the city. Independent branches of the Venetian health services immediately discontinued trade and travel to and from Venice, functioning independently with the immediate isolation order of the Venetian Senate until the outbreak abated. Other methods of disease control included an intricate network of information and messaging, allowing for efficient reporting of and response to outbreaks, and the capacity to mobilise local coastal garrisons to carry out inspections, allowing isolation of plague-infested areas using pre-existing infrastructure. Despite these precautions, epidemics continued to occur regularly in Venice. The outbreak of plague of 1576–1577 killed around 50,000 in Venice, almost a third of the population; a similar proportion of the population was killed in 1630 in the Italian plague of 1629-31, when around 46,000 of the city's 140,000 citizens were killed.

Within the city of Venice, the provveditori alla sanità relied upon the network of piovani, the elected administrators of the parishes, to control the spread of disease. Beginning in 1504, the piovani were required to report all illnesses and deaths within the parish on a daily basis. For illnesses, they were to record the signs and symptoms, particularly those indicative of plague, and to provide the names of any doctors that had been called. Burial licenses from the Magistrato alla Sanità were required with fines imposed for any unauthorized interments. Legislation in 1553 similarly required the heads of convents, monasteries, and recovering houses to report deaths.

In all matters of public health, Magistrato alla Sanità obtained supreme authority. It exercised authority in supervising a wide range of professions and services: in addition to the colleges of barbers and physicians, it regularly supervised the food industry, lazarets, waste disposal, sewage and water management and mortuary services. Together with the Collegio delle Beccarie, which regulated the sale of meat, and the Magistrato alle Acque, which protected the Venetian Lagoon from pollution, the Magistrato alla Sanità also oversaw the trades that utilized animal remains, including the tanners and cobblers.

The Magistrato alla Sanità was also known to interact with prostitutes, vagrants, beggars and guesthouses, further aiding the surveillance of possible transmission of foreign maladies within their jurisdiction.

The Venetian Magistrato alla Sanità was the second health provider in Italy to introduce variolation, which had only recently been introduced to Europe from eastern schools of medicine, as a means of inoculation against smallpox, preceded only by the Hospital of Santa Maria degli Innocenti in Florence, and the first to offer it freely to the public for purposes of herd immunity.

== Authority ==
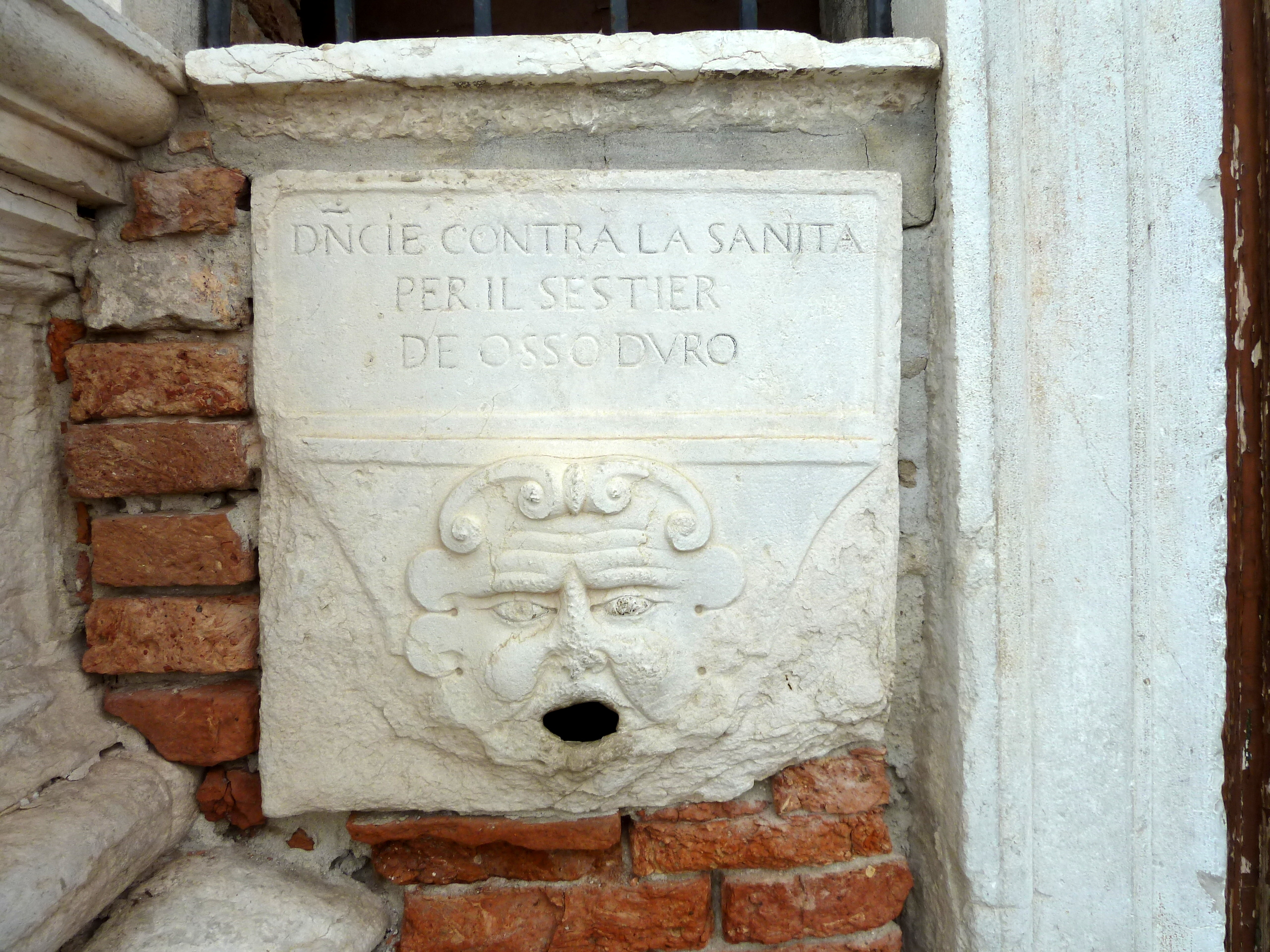
Receptacle in the sestiere of Dorsoduro for secret accusations concerning the violations of health laws

The three provveditori alla sanità had judicial authority to enforce the laws aimed at preventing the spread of infection. From 1504, their authority included the power to impose corporal punishment, notably torture and amputation, provided that there had been a unanimous vote of the provveditori. This authority was limited in 1539 when the Council of Ten, responsible for the security of the state, decreed that certain sentences could be appealed to the esecutori contro la bestemmia (executors against blasphemy) and the savi all'eresia (sages for heresy). These cases included sentences against prostitutes in matters of public hygiene which could be appealed to the esecutori.

With the first nomination of the two sopraprovveditori alla sanità in 1556, the Senate extended the judicial authority of the Magistrato alla Sanità to include capital punishment. This required a four-fifths vote of the entire magistracy. However, further limits were introduced in 1563: henceforth, the sentences of the Magistrato alla Sanità could be presented in appeal by the avogodori de comùn, the state prosecuting attorneys, to the Collegio dei X Savi del Corpo del Senato (College of Ten Sages of the Senate Body). (Note: The Collegio dei X Savi del Corpo del Senato was initially created to relieve the Full College of the responsibility for resolving disputes over tax exemptions and privileges for cities subject to Venice and for non-Venetians. It later came to also hear appeals for sentences issued by select standing committees of the Senate, including the Magistrato alla Sanità. The Collegio dei X Savi del Corpo del Senato was initially formed every six months by extracting ten senators by lot. In 1569, the number of members was increased to fifteen for exceptional cases, and in 1619 the number was increased to twenty, chosen by lot every four months from among the senators and former senators. With the reform of 1619, the organ was renamed the Collegio dei XX Savi del Corpo del Senato. See Andrea Da Mosto L'Archivio di Stato di Venezia..., p. 105.)

The provveditori alla sanità were authorized to receive secret accusations concerning the violation of health laws and norms, provided that the accusations were signed and included the names of at least two witnesses. Pecuniary rewards, normally amounting to one-third or one-fourth of the fine imposed on the transgressors, were typically given to the accusers as a means of encouraging collaboration. The accusations, which could be deposited in receptacles located throughout Venice and in the subject cities, generally concerned the failure to observe quarantine procedures and the removal of infected goods from the lazarets, the presence of beggars and migrants, the presence of medical charlatans and the trafficking in unauthorized medicines, the sale of infected meat or rotten food, the failure to maintain hygiene in stores and animal stalls, the polluting of the canals and streets, and unauthorized burials.

Although the Magistrato alla Sanità had supreme authority in matters of public health, jurisdiction over vagrants and beggars was shared beginning in 1588 with the provveditori sopra ospedali e luoghi pii (superintendents of hospitals and recovery houses).

The authority of the Magistrato alla Sanità extended not only to the entirety of the Venetian Lagoon but also to the other cities of the Venetian Republic by means of establishing health offices in each. Extensive infrastructure was introduced in the Ionian Islands, which were viewed particularly throughout the 17th and 18th centuries as likely sources of disease outbreaks due to their proximity to Asia Minor and, by extension, the Ottoman Empire. However, in many cases, the magistracy's authority was often not direct; for example, the lazarets were able to bypass local health authorities and report directly to the regional government in times of low disease activity, only falling under the health office's direct jurisdiction in times of emergency.

During the Fall of the Republic of Venice, as Napoleon’s troops were occupying the Republic's territory with numerous reforms to government and infrastructure, the office of the Magistrato alla Sanità was folded into the Health Committee (Italian: Comitato di Sanità) for a short period of time before eventually being disbanded, with its duties assigned to other magistracies.

== Archive ==
The Archive of the superintendents of health contains nearly four centuries of documentation on not only the conditions of public health and sanitation within the Venetian Republic, but also of other contemporary states, on account of the extensive information gathered by the officials from their foreign counterparts as part of their regular surveillance of potential foreign-borne epidemics. The inventory for the archive, along with an index of names and locations, was published by Salvatore Carbone in 1962.

== Bibliography ==
- Beltrami, Daniele, Storia della popolazione di Venezia dalla fine del secolo XVI alla caduta della Repubblica (Padua: Cedam, 1954)
- Da Mosto, Andrea, L'Archivio di Stato di Venezia, indice generale, storico, descrittivo ed analitico (Roma: Biblioteca d'Arte editrice, 1937)
- Maranini, Giuseppe, La Costituzione di Venezia, II (Firenze: La Nuova Italia, 1931, repr. 1974)
- Milan, Catia, Antonio Politi, and Bruno Vianello, Guida alle magistrature: elementi per la conoscenza della Repubblica veneta (Sommacampagna: Cierre, 2003) ISBN 8883142047
- Preto, Paolo, 'Lo spionaggio sanitario', in Nelli-Elena Vanzan Marchini, ed., Rotte mediterranee e baluardi di sanità (Milano: Skira, 2004), pp. 69–73 ISBN 8884917514
- Semprini, Antonio History of smallpox (Storia del vaiolo).
- Tiepolo, Maria Francesca, 'Venezia', in La Guida generale degli Archivi di Stato, IV (Roma: Ministero per i beni culturali e ambientali, Ufficio centrale per i beni archivistici, 1994), pp. 857–1014, 1062–1070, 1076–1140 ISBN 9788871250809
- Vanzan Marchini, Nelli-Elena, 'L'esercizio dell'assistenza e il corpo anfibio', in F. Della Peruta, ed., Sanità e Società, Veneto, Lombardia, Piemonte, Liguria, secoli XVII-XX (Udine: Casamassima, 1989), pp. 17–35
- Vanzan Marchini, Nelli-Elena, I mali e i rimedi della Serenissima (Vicenza, Neri Pozza, 1995) ISBN 8873054803
- Vanzan Marchini, Nelli-Elena, Venezia e i lazzaretti Mediterranei: catalogo della mostra nella Biblioteca Nazionale Marciana 2004 (Mariano del Friuli: Edizioni della laguna, 2004) ISBN 8883451562
- Vanzan Marchini, Nelli-Elena, 'Venezia e l'invenzione del Lazzaretto', in Nelli-Elena Vanzan Marchini, ed., Rotte mediterranee e baluardi di sanità (Milano: Skira, 2004), pp. 17–45 ISBN 8884917514
- Vanzan Marchini, Nelli-Elena, Venezia e Trieste sulle rotte della ricchezza e della paura (Verona: Cierre, 2016) ISBN 9788883148569
- Vanzan Marchini, Nelli-Elena, Venezia, la salute e la fede (Vittorio Veneto: De Bastiani, 2011) ISBN 9788884662231
