= Bone conduction =

Conduction of sound to the inner ear

Bone conduction is the conduction of sound to the inner ear primarily through the bones of the skull, allowing the hearer to perceive audio content even if the ear canal is blocked. Bone conduction transmission occurs constantly as sound waves vibrate bone, specifically the bones in the skull, although it is hard for the average individual to distinguish sound being conveyed through the bone as opposed to the sound being conveyed through the air via the ear canal. Intentional transmission of sound through bone can be used with individuals with normal hearing—as with bone-conduction headphones—or as a treatment option for certain types of hearing impairment. Bones are generally more effective at transmitting lower-frequency sounds compared to higher-frequency sounds.

Bone conduction is also called the second auditory pathway, not to be confused with cartilage conduction, which is considered the third auditory pathway.

== Overview ==
Bone conduction is one reason why a person's voice sounds different to them when it is recorded and played back. Because the skull conducts lower frequencies better than air, people perceive their own voices to be lower and fuller than others do, and a recording of one's own voice frequently sounds higher than one expects (see voice confrontation).

Some commercial headsets use bone conduction combined with real-time filtering to modify a user's perception of their own voice (e.g., Forbrain).

Musicians may use bone conduction using a tuning fork while tuning stringed instruments. After the fork starts vibrating, placing it in the mouth with the stem between the back teeth ensures that one continues to hear the note via bone conduction, and both hands are free to do the tuning. Ludwig van Beethoven was famously rumored to be using bone conduction after losing most of his hearing, by placing one end of a rod in his mouth and resting the other end on the rim of his piano.

It has also been observed that some animals can perceive sound and even communicate by sending and receiving vibration through bone.

Comparison of hearing sensitivity through bone conduction and directly through the ear canal can aid audiologists in identifying pathologies of the middle ear—the area between the tympanic membrane (ear drum) and the cochlea (inner ear). If hearing is markedly better through bone conduction than through the ear canal (air-bone gap), problems with the ear canal (e.g. ear wax accumulation), the tympanic membrane or ossicles can be suspected. This method was first discovered by Italian physician Hieronymus Capivacci.

Research has investigated the acoustic properties of the skull in children with specific language disorders and how these properties may influence hearing. In one study, broadband noise was analyzed using both controlled audiology-room testing and a custom helmet fitted with multiple bone microphones positioned over cranial gaps, with spectral analysis performed using Fast Fourier Transform and one-third-octave bands. Energetic peaks were observed around 63 and 125 Hz, primarily on the left side of the skull, and individual skull acoustic patterns were found to correlate with bone-conduction thresholds but not with air-conduction thresholds, suggesting a mediating role of skull acoustics in hearing.

== Hearing aids and implants ==
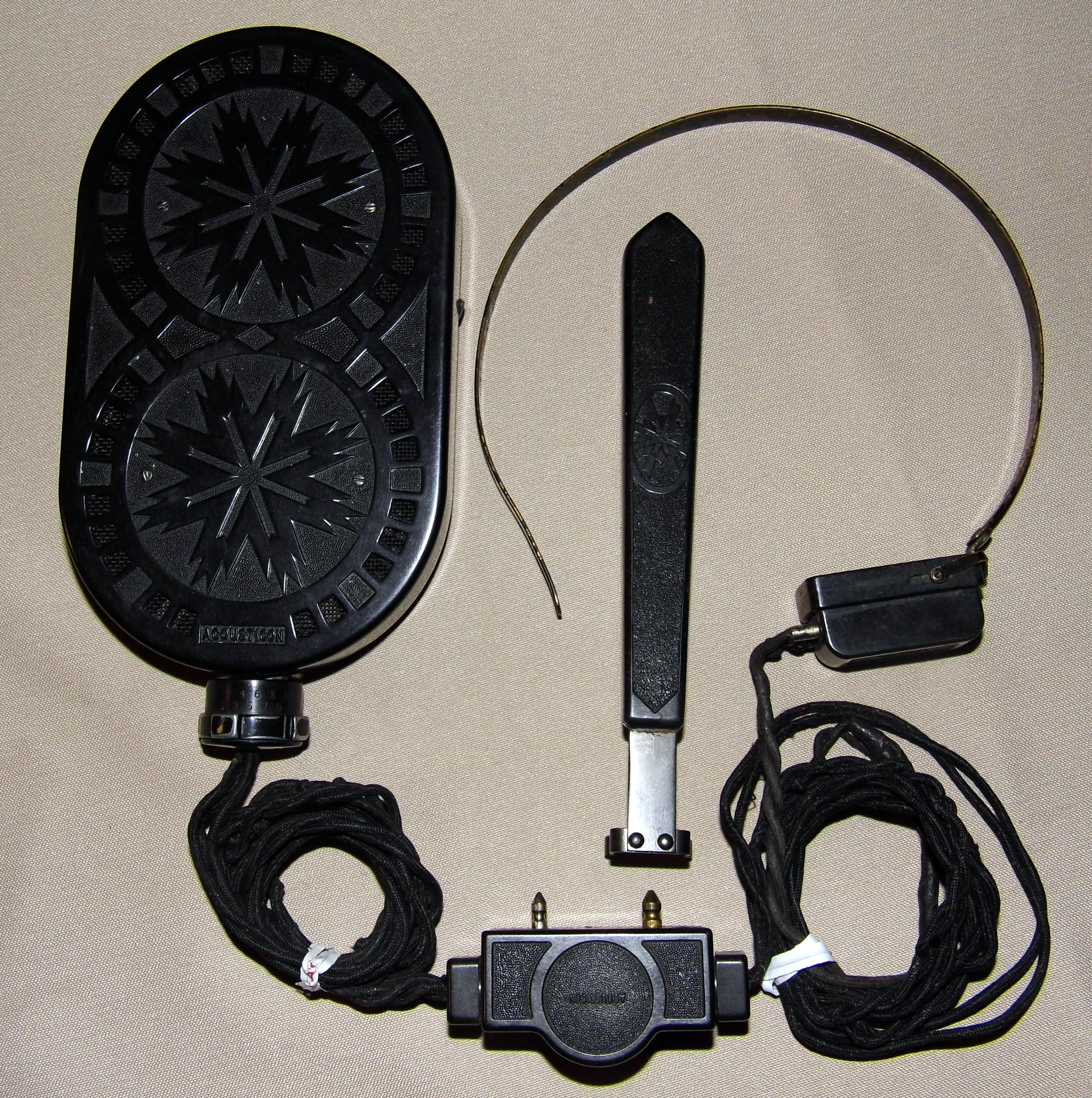
Image of a Vintage Acousticon Hearing Aid By Dictograph Products Company, Made in the US, Circa 1934.

=== History ===
The first bone conduction hearing aids were invented in the 15th century. Italian physician Girolamo Cardano realized that when a rod was placed between someone's teeth and attached the other end to a musical instrument, the person could hear the music despite their hearing loss. This method was used by Beethoven, as his hearing deteriorated towards the end of his life. In the 1820s, French physician Jean Marc Gaspard Itard improved on this device by attaching the other end of the rod not to a musical instrument but to the mouth of another speaker. This invention was known as the Rod of Itard. Alexander Graham Bell's invention of the telephone in 1876 made it possible to convert electrical signals into acoustic stimuli. According to Sterne's study, the telephone contributed to the "leveling of rank differences," as only wealthy people had access to these new sound reproduction technologies. These technologies were seen as a means of immediate communication or as a provider of intimacy.

In 1923, Hugo Gernsback created a new kind of bone conduction hearing aid called the "Osophone", which he later elaborated on with his "Phonosone". Bone conduction hearing aids have also been fitted to glasses, which fit tightly to the side of the head.

In the 1970s, a team of doctors in Gothenburg, most notably Anders Tjellström, had the idea to implant a bone vibrator plate into the mastoid bone with an adjoining screw that allowed an external audio processor to be attached to conduct sound. The first three patients were implanted in 1977. The device gave good results and became known as a bone-anchored hearing aid, or BAHA. In 2012, this idea was taken a step further by the introduction of the BONEBRIDGE device. Whereas a BAHA implant is a percutaneous device that requires the screw abutment to protrude through the skin, the BONEBRIDGE is a transcutaneous device and is fully implanted under the skin. In this case, the audio processor is held in place by magnets.

=== Candidacy ===
Bone conduction devices are suitable for patients with conductive or mixed hearing loss, with a functioning cochlea but problems with the outer or inner ear that prevent sound vibrations from reaching the cochlea. This can be caused by conditions such as atresia, microtia, Goldenhar syndrome or Treacher Collins. Bone conduction is also a good option for someone who cannot use traditional air conduction hearing aids.

Bone conduction devices are also used to help people with single-sided deafness, who have a non-functioning inner ear on one side. In this situation, the device picks up sounds on the non-functioning side and sends them as vibrations through the bone to the functioning cochlea on the other side.

=== Technology ===
There are many different types of bone conduction hearing aids but most of them work on the same principle and comprise necessary components like microphones, signal processing, energy supply and a transducer that generates vibrations. The microphone of the hearing aid picks up sound signals from the environment. The signal is then optimized and transmitted to the transducer, which generates vibrations. Depending on the specific bone conduction hearing aid system, the vibrations are either sent directly through the skull bone, or through the skin towards the inner ear. Finally, the inner ear picks up the vibrations and sends them to the auditory cortex in the brain.

=== Surgical and non-surgical bone conduction devices ===
Surgical bone conduction devices consist of an internal implant and an external audio processor used to transmit sound. They require surgery in order to implant the device, which is usually done as an outpatient procedure under general anesthetic, however this depends on the device being implanted and the health condition of the patient.

Non-surgical devices only consist of the external audio processor. The processor simply vibrates, making both the skin and the bone vibrate, conducting the vibrations through to the cochlea. Non-surgical devices are ideal for children, who may not be old enough for implantation surgery or who have temporary conductive hearing loss caused by glue ear or ear infections.

There are various ways to attach non-surgical bone conduction devices to the skin, including headbands, adhesives and bone conduction glasses. Devices include the ADHEAR from MED-EL, the BAHA Start from Cochlear, BHM's contact mini or contact forte and the Ponto Softband from Oticon Medical. Unlike headbands or glasses-based devices, adhesive devices do not need to apply pressure against the head in order to transmit the vibration. Because of this, users of adhesive devices report wearing their device for longer each day.

=== Surgical devices: percutaneous and transcutaneous devices ===
A transcutaneous bone conduction device transmits sound signals, either electronic or mechanical, through the skin. In other words, there is closed, intact skin between the external audio processor and the internal implant. The processor is held in place over the implant using magnetic attraction. Transcutaneous devices currently on the market include the BAHA Attract, and Osia from Cochlear and the BONEBRIDGE from MED-EL. With a percutaneous device, part of the implant (known as the abutment) protrudes through the skin. The audio processor then snaps onto the abutment, providing a direct connection to the implant. Percutaneous devices include the BAHA Connect from Cochlear and the Ponto from Oticon Medical. Percutaneous devices have been associated with skin complications, ranging from slight redness to the formation of granulation tissue and recurring infection. The most serious complications might require further surgery or abutment removal and subsequent reimplantation. One study into skin problems with percutaneous implants revealed a complication rate of up to 84%. In another study a meta-analysis of complications with osseointegrated hearing aids showed that revision surgery is required in up to 34.5% of cases. Transcutaneous devices were later designed to avoid or reduce recurring skin complications.

=== Surgical devices: active and passive ===
An active bone conduction device is one where the implant generates the vibrations that directly stimulate the bone. With a passive bone conduction device, the vibrations are generated by the audio processor before being passed through the skin or an abutment to reach the implant and the bone. The main active bone conduction devices available are the BONEBRIDGE from MED-EL and the Osia from Cochlear. Both are active transcutaneous devices. The external audio processor picks up sound vibrations and transmits them electronically through the skin to the internal implant, which directly and actively vibrates the bone. These vibrations are conducted through the skull bone to the cochlea and are processed as normal.

The main passive bone conduction devices are the BAHA Attract and BAHA Connect from Cochlear, the Ponto from Oticon and the Alpha 2 MPO from Medtronic. The BAHA Connect and Ponto are passive percutaneous devices, whereby the audio processor is fixed onto an abutment placed through the skin. The audio processor vibrates, sending the vibrations via the abutment to the implant and then through the bone to the cochlea. The BAHA Attract and Alpha 2 are transcutaneous devices but they work in a similar way. The audio processor vibrates, sending mechanical vibrations to the implant through the bone. However, unlike with the percutaneous devices, the vibrations from the audio processor pass through the skin before they reach the internal implant. These vibrations are then conducted through the skull bones to the cochlea and are processed as normal, just like with an active device.

Active transcutaneous and passive percutaneous bone conduction devices tend to deliver better sound quality than passive transcutaneous ones. Passive transcutaneous devices send sound vibrations through the skin, and as they pass through the skin, they lose some of their strength, causing signal attenuation of up to 20dB. To counteract this, passive transcutaneous devices may require the use of strong magnets that squeeze the skin to achieve optimal conduction. This can lead to pain and irritation of the skin and soft tissue between the two magnets, and in worst cases cause necrosis. A study found that major complications—defined as complications requiring active management, such as post-operative seroma, hematoma, wound infections, skin ulcerations, and dehiscence—were found in 5.2% of cases.

=== Device overview ===
Device	Surgical	Non-surgical	Active surgical	Passive surgical	Transcutaneous surgical	Percutaneous surgical
ADHEAR	x	✓	N/A	N/A	N/A	N/A
Alpha 2	✓	x	x	✓	✓ * (see above)	
BAHA Attract	✓	x	x	✓	✓ * (see above)	x
BAHA Connect	✓	x	x	✓	x	✓
BAHA Start	x	✓	N/A	N/A	N/A	N/A
BONEBRIDGE	✓	x	✓	x	✓	x
Osia	✓	x	✓	x	✓	x
Ponto	✓	x	x	✓	x	✓

== Products ==
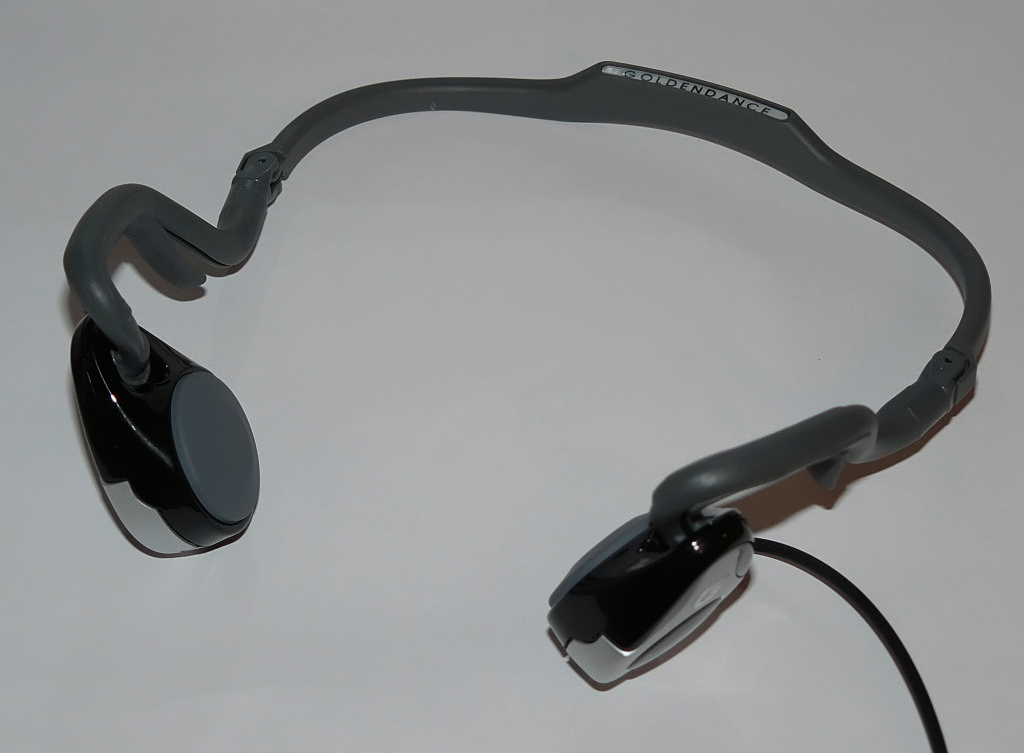
A bone conduction headset (GoldenDance brand)

Bone conduction products are usually categorized into three groups:

- Ordinary products, such as hands-free headsets or headphones
- Bone-anchored hearing aids and assistive listening devices
- Specialized communication products (e.g. for underwater or high-noise environments)

One example of a specialized communication product is a bone conduction speaker that is used by scuba divers. The device is a rubber over-moulded, piezoelectric flexing disc that is approximately 40 millimetres (1.6 in) across and 6 millimetres (0.24 in) thick. A connecting cable is molded into the disc, resulting in a tough, waterproof assembly. In use, the speaker is strapped against one of the dome-shaped bone protrusions behind the ear and the sound, which can be surprisingly clear and crisp, seems to come from inside the user's head.

== Notable uses ==
The Google Glass device employs bone conduction technology for the relay of information to the user through a transducer that sits beside the user's ear. The use of bone conduction means that any vocal content that is received by the Glass user is nearly inaudible to outsiders.

German broadcaster Sky Deutschland and advertising agency BBDO Germany collaborated on an advertising campaign that uses bone conduction that was premiered in Cannes, France, at the International Festival of Creativity in June 2013. The "Talking Window" advertising concept uses bone conduction to transmit advertising to public transport passengers who lean their heads against train glass windows. Academics from Australia's Macquarie University suggested that, apart from not touching the window, passengers would need to use a dampening device that is made of material that would not transmit the vibration from the window in order to not hear the sound.

Land Rover BAR employed 'military' bone conduction technology, designed by BAE Systems, within their helmets for use within the 2017 America's Cup. The helmets allowed the crews to communicate effectively with each other under race conditions and within the harsh, noisy environment; whilst maintaining situational awareness due to their ears being uncovered.

In March 2019 at The National Maritime Museum, London, British composer Hollie Harding premiered the use of Bone Conduction Headphones as part of a musical performance. The use of the technology allowed the audience to listen to a pre-recorded musical track on the headsets, whilst a live orchestra performed a separate but related musical track. This multilayered effect meant that electronic and digitally-edited sounds could be heard in conjunction with live music without the use of loud-speakers for the first time and that the source of sounds could appear to be close to, far from, or all around the listener.

== Safety ==
Because bone conduction headphones transmit sound to the inner ear through the bones of the skull, leaving the ears free to pick up sound from the environment, users can listen to audio while maintaining greater situational awareness than with acoustic in- or over-ear headphones. However, users may still be less aware of their environment than if not using headphones.

== See also ==
- Bone conduction auditory brainstem response
- Cochlear Baha
- Headphones
- Rinne test
- SoundBite Hearing System
- Weber test
