= Behavioral observation audiometry =

Type of audiometry

- Based on: Hearing testing

Behavioral observation audiometry (BOA) is a type of audiometry (a test of hearing for ability to recognize pitch, volume, etc.) done in children less than six months old.
