= Visual reinforcement audiometry =

Visual reinforcement audiometry (VRA) is a key behavioural test for evaluating hearing in young children. First introduced by Liden and Kankkunen in 1969, VRA is a good indicator of how responsive a child is to sound and speech and whether the child is developing awareness to sound as expected. Performed by an audiologist, VRA is the preferred behavioral technique for children that are 6 – 24 months of age. Using classic operant conditioning, a stimulus is presented, which is followed by a 90 degree head turn from midline by the child, resulting in the child being reinforced with an animation. The child is typically seated in a high chair or on a parent's lap while facing forward. A loud speaker or two are situated at 45 or 90 degrees from the child. As the auditory stimulus is presented, the child will naturally search for the sound source, resulting in a head turn and reinforcement is followed shortly after through an animated toy or video next to the speaker where the auditory stimulus was presented. Using VRA, an audiologist can obtain minimal hearing thresholds ranging in frequencies from 250 Hz - 8000 Hz using speakers, headphones, inserts earphones or through a bone conduction transducer and plot them on an audiogram. The results from the audiogram, paired with other objective measures such as a Tympanogram, Otoacoustic emissions testing and/or Auditory Brainstem Response testing can provide further insight into the child's auditory hearing status as well as future treatment plans if deemed necessary. VRA works well until about 18–24 months of age. Above 18–24 months of age, children need more interesting tasks to hold their attention, which is when audiologists introduce Conditioned Play Audiometry.

Conditioned orientation reflex (COR) is a variant of VRA where more than one sound is used. The key difference between COR and VRA is that COR is dependent on the child to have the ability to detect and localize the sound, whereas VRA only requires the child to have a head turn response after the auditory stimulus is presented, they do not need to accurately localize the sound as well.
