= Compound action potential =

In neurophysiology, the Compound action potential (or CAP) refers to various evoked potentials representing the summation of synchronized individual action potentials generated by a group of neurons or muscle fibers in response to a stimulus. Alike individual action potentials, CAP waveforms are typically biphasic presenting a negative and positive peak. The morphological attributes of the CAP (amplitude, spread, latency) depend on various factors including electrode placement, stimulus intensity, number of fibers recruited, the synchronization of action potentials, and conduction properties of the neural or muscular fibers.

In most occurrences, the CAP refers to:

- the auditory compound action potential (CAP), generated by the auditory nerve, or
- the compound muscle action potential (CMAP)
