= Auditory brainstem response =

Auditory phenomenon in the brain

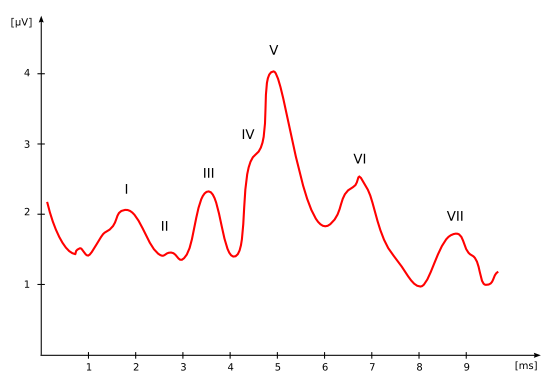
Graph showing a typical Auditory Brainstem Response

The auditory brainstem response (ABR), also called brainstem evoked response audiometry (BERA) or brainstem auditory evoked potentials (BAEPs) or brainstem auditory evoked responses (BAERs) is an auditory evoked potential extracted from ongoing electrical activity in the brain and recorded via electrodes placed on the scalp. The recording is a series of six to seven vertex positive waves of which I through V are evaluated. These waves, labeled with Roman numerals in Jewett/Williston convention, occur in the first 10 milliseconds after onset of an auditory stimulus. The ABR is termed an exogenous response because it is dependent upon external factors.

The auditory structures that generate the auditory brainstem response are believed to be as follows:

- Wave I through III – generated by the auditory branch of cranial nerve VIII and lower
- Wave IV and V – generated by the upper brainstem

Waves I and II originate from the distal and proximal auditory nerve fibers, wave III from the cochlear nucleus, IV showing activity in the superior olivary complex, and wave V with the lateral lemniscus.

== History ==
In 1967, Sohmer and Feinmesser were the first to publish human ABRs recorded with surface electrodes, showing that cochlear potentials could be obtained non-invasively. In 1971, Jewett and Williston gave a clear description of the human ABR and correctly interpreted the later waves as arriving from the brainstem. In 1977, Selters and Brackman reported on prolonged inter-peak latencies in tumor cases (greater than 1 cm). In 1974, Hecox and Galambos showed that ABR could be used for threshold estimation in adults and infants. In 1975, Starr and Achor were the first to report the effects on the ABR of CNS pathology in the brainstem.

Long and Allen were the first to report abnormal brainstem auditory evoked potentials (BAEPs) in an alcoholic woman who recovered from acquired central hypoventilation syndrome. These investigators hypothesized that their patient's brainstem was poisoned, but not destroyed, by her chronic alcoholism.

== Measurement techniques ==
=== Recording parameters ===
- Electrode montage: most performed with a vertical montage (high forehead [active or positive], earlobes or mastoids [reference right & left or negative], low forehead [ground]
- Impedance: 5 kΩ or less (also equal between electrodes)
- Filter settings: 30–1500 Hz bandwidth
- Time window: 10ms (minimum)
- Sampling rate: usually high sampling rate of circa 20 kHz
- Intensity: usually start at 70 dBnHL
- Stimulus type: click (100 us long), chirp or toneburst
- Transducer type: insert, bone vibrator, sound field, headphones
- Stimulation or repetition rate: 21.1 (for example)
- Amplification: 100–150K
- n (# of averages/ sweeps): 1000 minimum (1500 recommended)
- Polarity: rarefaction or alternating recommended

== Applications ==
The ABR is used for newborn hearing screening, auditory threshold estimation, intraoperative monitoring, diagnosing hearing loss type and degree, auditory nerve and brainstem lesion detection, and in development of cochlear implants.

Site-of-lesion testing is sensitive to large acoustic tumors.

== Variants ==
=== Stacked ABR ===
Stacked ABR is the sum of the synchronous neural activity generated from five frequency regions across the cochlea in response to click stimulation and high-pass pink noise masking. This technique was based on the 8th cranial nerve compound action potential work of Teas, Eldredge, and Davis in 1962. In 2005, Don defined the Stacked ABR as "...an attempt to record the sum of the neural activity across the entire frequency region of the cochlea in response to a click stimuli."

Traditional ABR has poor sensitivity to sub-centimeter tumors. In the 1990s, studies recommended that using ABRs to detect acoustic tumors should be abandoned. As a result, many practitioners switched to MRI for this purpose.

ABR does not identify small tumors because they rely on latency changes of peak voltage (V). Peak V is primarily influenced by high-frequency fibers. Tumors will be missed if those fibers are unaffected. Although the click stimulates a wide frequency region on the cochlea, phase cancellation of the lower-frequency responses occurs as a result of time delays along the basilar membrane. Small tumors may not sufficiently affect those fibers.

However, MRI-ing every patient is not practical given its high cost, impact on patient comfort, and limited availability in many areas. In 1997, Don and colleagues introduced the Stacked ABR as a way to enhance sensitivity to smaller tumors. Their hypothesis was that the ABR-stacked derived-band ABR amplitude could detect tumors missed by standard ABRs. In 2005, Don stated that it would be clinically valuable to have available an ABR test to screen for small tumors. The Stacked ABR is sensitive, specific, widely available, comfortable, and cost-effective.

==== Methodology ====
The stacked ABR is a composite of activity from ALL frequency regions of the cochlea – not just high frequency.

1. Obtain Click-evoked ABR responses to clicks and high-pass pink masking noise (ipsilateral masking)
2. Obtain derived-band ABRs (DBR)
3. Shift & align the wave V peaks of the DBR – thus, "stacking" the waveforms with wave V lined up
4. Add the waveforms together
5. Compare the amplitude of the Stacked ABR with the click-evoked ABR from the same ear

When the derived waveforms are representing activity from more apical regions along the basilar membrane, wave V latencies are prolonged because of the nature of the traveling wave. In order to compensate for these latency shifts, the wave V component for each derived waveform is stacked (aligned), added together, and then the resulting amplitude is measured. In 2005, Don explains that in a normal ear, the sum of the Stacked ABR will have the same amplitude as the Click-evoked ABR. But, the presence of even a small tumor results in a reduction in the amplitude of the Stacked ABR in comparison with the Click-evoked ABR.

==== Effectiveness ====
Screening and detecting sub-centimeter acoustic tumors, the Stacked ABR offers:

- 95% Sensitivity
- 83% Specificity

(Note: 100% sensitivity was obtained at 50% specificity)

In a 2007 comparative study of ABR abnormalities in acoustic tumor patients, Montaguti, et.al., described Stacked ABR as having the potential to identify small acoustic neuromas.

=== Tone-burst ABR ===
Tone-burst ABR is used to obtain thresholds for children who are too young to otherwise reliably respond behaviorally to frequency-specific acoustic stimuli. The most common frequencies tested are 500, 1000, 2000, and 4000 Hz, as these frequencies are generally necessary for hearing aid programming.

=== Auditory steady-state response ===
Auditory steady-state response (ASSR) is an auditory evoked potential, elicited with modulated tones that can be used to predict hearing sensitivity in patients of all ages. It is an electrophysiologic response to rapid auditory stimuli and creates a statistically valid estimated audiogram (evoked potential predicts hearing thresholds). ASSR uses statistical measures to identify thresholds is a "cross-check" for verification purposes prior to arriving at a differential diagnosis.

In 1981, Galambos and colleagues reported on the "40 Hz auditory potential" which is a continuous 400 Hz tone sinusoidally 'amplitude modulated' at 40 Hz and at 70 dB SPL. This produced a frequency-specific response, but the response was influenced by state of arousal. In 1991, Cohen and colleagues learned that by presenting at >70 Hz, the response was smaller, but less affected by sleep. In 1994, Rickards and colleagues showed that it was possible to obtain responses in newborns. In 1995, Lins and Picton found that simultaneous stimuli presented at rates in the 80 to 100 Hz range made it possible to obtain auditory thresholds.

==== Methodology ====
ASSR uses the same or similar montages as ABR recordings. Two active electrodes are placed at or near vertex and at ipsilateral earlobe/mastoid with ground at low forehead. Collecting from both ears simultaneously requires a two-channel pre-amplifier. Single channel recordings can detect activity from a binaural presentation. A common reference electrode may be located at the nape of the neck. Transducers can be earphones, headphones, a bone oscillator, or sound field. It is preferable for the patient to be asleep. The high pass filter might be approximately 40 to 90 Hz and low pass filter might be between 320 and 720 Hz with typical filter slopes of 6 dB per octave. Gain settings of 10,000 are common, artifact reject is "on", and manual "override" allows the clinician to make decisions during test and correct as appropriate.

=== Comparison ===
Similarities:

- Both record bioelectric activity from electrodes arranged in similar arrays.
- Both use auditory evoked potentials.
- Both use acoustic stimuli delivered through inserts (preferably).
- Both can be used to estimate thresholds for patients who cannot or will not participate in traditional behavioral measures.

Differences:

- ASSR looks at amplitude and phases in the spectral (frequency) domain rather than at amplitude and latency.
- ASSR depends on peak detection across a spectrum rather than across a time vs. amplitude waveform.
- ASSR is evoked using repeated sound stimuli presented at a high repetition rate rather than an abrupt sound at a relatively low rate.
- ABR typically uses click or tone-burst stimuli in one ear at a time, but ASSR can be used binaurally while evaluating broad bands or four frequencies (500, 1k, 2k, & 4k) simultaneously.
- ABR estimates thresholds basically from 1-4k in typical hearing losses. ASSR can estimate thresholds in the same range, but offers more frequency specific information more quickly and can estimate hearing in the severe-to-profound hearing loss ranges.
- ABR depends upon a subjective analysis of the amplitude/latency function. ASSR uses a statistical analysis.
- ABR is measured in microvolts (millionths of a volt) while ASSR is measured in nanovolts (billionths of a volt).

=== Analysis, normative data, and trends ===
Analysis is dependent upon the fact that related bioelectric events coincide with the stimulus repetition rate. The specific analysis method is based on the manufacturer's detection algorithm. It occurs in the spectral domain and is composed of specific frequency components that are harmonics of the stimulus repetition rate. ASSR systems incorporate higher harmonics in their detection algorithms. Most equipment provides correction tables for converting ASSR thresholds to estimated HL audiograms and are found to be within 10 dB to 15 dB of audiometric thresholds, although studies vary. Correction data depends on variables such as equipment, frequencies, collection time, subject age, sleep state, and stimulus parameters.

== Hearing aid fittings ==
In certain cases where behavioral thresholds cannot be attained, ABR thresholds can be used for hearing aid fittings. Fitting formulas such as DSL v5.0 allow the hearing aid settings to be based on the ABR thresholds. Correction factors exist for converting ABR thresholds to behavioral thresholds, but vary greatly. For example, one set involves lowering ABR thresholds from 1000 to 4000 Hz by 10 dB and lowering the ABR threshold at 500 Hz by 15 to 20 dB. Previously, brainstem audiometry was used for hearing aid selection by using normal and pathological intensity-amplitude functions to determine appropriate amplification. The principal idea was based on the assumption that amplitudes of the brainstem potentials were directly related to loudness perception. Under this assumption, the amplitudes of brainstem potentials stimulated by the hearing devices should exhibit close-to-normal values. ABR thresholds do not necessarily improve in the aided condition. ABR can be an inaccurate indicator of hearing aid benefit due to difficulty processing the appropriate amount of fidelity of the transient stimuli used to evoke a response. Bone conduction ABR thresholds can be used if other limitations are present, but thresholds are not as accurate as ABR thresholds recorded through air conduction.

Advantages:

- evaluation of loudness perception in the dynamic range of hearing (recruitment)
- determination of basic hearing aid properties (gain, compression factor, compression onset level)
- cases with middle ear impairment (contrary to acoustic reflex methods)
- non-cooperative subjects even in sleep
- sedation or anesthesia without influence of age and vigilance (contrary to cortical evoked responses).

Disadvantages:

- in cases of severe hearing impairment including no or only poor information as to loudness perception
- no control of compression setting
- no frequency-specific hearing compensation

== Cochlear implantation and central auditory development ==
Some 188,000 people around the world have cochlear implants. In the United States, 30,000 adults and over 30,000 children have them. In 1961, the otologist W.F. House began work on the predecessor of cochlear implants. The first implant was approved by the FDA in 1984. It was a single-channel device and led to multi-channel cochlear implants. Cochlear implants transforms sound received by the implant's microphone into radio waves using the external sound processor. The external transmitting coil transmits the (frequency-modulated) radio waves through the skin. The signal is not turned back into sounds. The internal receiver stimulator delivers the correct electrical stimulation to the appropriate internal electrodes to represent the sounds. The electrode array stimulates auditory nerve fibers in the cochlea, which carry the signal to the brain.

One way to measure the status of the auditory cortical pathways is to study the latency of cortical auditory evoked potentials (CAEP). In particular, the latency of the first positive peak (P1) of the CAEP is of interest. P1 is a robust positive wave occurring at around 100 to 300 ms in children. P1 latency represents the synaptic delays throughout the peripheral and central auditory pathways. P1 in children is considered a marker for maturation of the auditory cortical areas.

P1 latency changes as a function of age, and is considered an index of cortical auditory maturation. P1 latency and age have a strong negative correlation, decrease in P1 latency with increasing age. This is most likely due to more efficient synaptic transmission over time. The P1 waveform also broadens with age. P1 neural generators are thought to originate from the thalamo-cortical portion of the auditory cortex. P1 may be the first recurrent activity in the auditory cortex. The negative component following P1 is called N1. N1 is not consistently seen in children until 12 years or age.

A 2006 study measured the P1 response in deaf children who received cochlear implants at different ages to examine the limits of plasticity in the central auditory system. Children who received cochlear implant stimulation while younger than 3.5 years had normal P1 latencies. Children older than seven years had abnormal latencies. Children between 3.5 and 7 had variable latencies. Studies in 2005 and 2007 reported that children with early implants the P1 had normal waveform morphology. Children with later implants had abnormal waveforms abnormal with lower amplitudes. A 2008 study used source reconstruction and dipole source analysis derived from high density EEG recordings to estimate P1 generators in three groups of children: normal hearing children, children implanted before age four, and children implanted after age seven. Findings concluded that the waveform morphology of normal hearing children and early implanted children were similar.

== See also ==
- Auditory system
- Bone conduction auditory brainstem response
- Cochlea
- EEG
- Evoked potential
- Otoacoustic emission
- International Society of Audiology
