= Stimulus filtering =

When the nervous system does not respond to stimuli

Stimulus filtering occurs when an animal's nervous system fails to respond to stimuli that would otherwise cause a reaction to occur. The nervous system has developed the capability to perceive and distinguish between minute differences in stimuli, which allows the animal to only react to significant impetus. This enables the animal to conserve energy as it is not responding to unimportant signals.

== Adaptive value ==
The proximate causes of stimulus filtering can be many things in and around an animal's environment, but the ultimate cause of this response may be the evolutionary advantage offered by stimulus filtering. An animal that saves energy by not responding to unnecessary stimuli may have increased fitness, which means that it would be able to produce more offspring, whereas an animal that does not filter stimuli may have reduced fitness due to depleted energy stores. An animal that practices stimulus filtering may also be more likely to respond appropriately to serious threats than an animal that is distracted by unimportant stimuli.

== Physiological mechanism ==
When particular signals are received by the animal, the superior-ranking neurons determine which signals are important enough to preserve and which signals are insignificant and can be ignored. This process essentially works as a filter as the synapses of the neural network enhance certain signals and repress others, with simple stimuli receiving attention from lower-level neurons, and more complicated stimuli receiving attention from higher level neurons.

== Relation to humans ==
Stimulus filtering is also seen in humans on a day-to-day basis. The cocktail party effect refers to the situation where people in a crowded room tend to ignore other conversations and just focus on the one they are participating in. This effect also works in that when an individual hears their name in another's conversation they immediately focus on that conversation.

== Examples ==
=== Moths ===
The evolution of a moth's auditory system has helped them escape a bat's echolocation. Physically a moth has two ears on each side of the thorax where they receive ultrasonic indicators to hear the distinct vocalizations that then vibrate the membranes of the moths ears at one of two auditory receptors: A1 or A2. These are attached to the tympanum in the ear. Intense sound pressure waves sweep over the moth's body causing the tympanum to vibrate and deforming these receptor cells. This opens stretch-sensitive channels in the cell membrane and provides the effective stimuli for a moth auditory receptor. These receptors work in the same ways that most neurons do, by responding to the energy contained in selected stimuli and changing the permeability of their cell membranes to positively charged ions. Even though the A1 and A2 receptors work in a similar fashion, there are significant differences between them. The A1 receptor is the main bat detector, and as the rate of firing increases the moth turns away from the bat to reduce sonar echo. In other words, the A1 receptor is sensitive to low frequencies. To determine the relative position of the bat the differential firing rates of the A1 cells will fire on either side of the moth's head and if the bat is farther away cells receive a weaker signal and will fire at a slower rate. The A2 receptor is the emergency back-up system by initiating erratic flight movements as a last-ditch effort to evade capture. This differential sensitivity of the A1 and A2 sensory neurons leads to stimulus filtering of the bat vocalizations. Long-distance evasion tactics are engaged when the bat is far away and therefore the A1 sensory neurons fire. When the bat is in extremely close range, short-distance evasion tactics are engaged with the use of A2 sensory neurons. The adaptive value of the physiological mechanisms of two distinct receptors aids in the evasion of capture from bats.

=== Parasitoid flies ===
Female flies of the genus Ormia ochracea possess organs in their bodies that can detect frequencies of cricket sounds from meters away. This process is important for the survival of their species because females will lay their first instar larvae into the body of the cricket, where they will feed and molt for approximately seven days. After this period, the larvae grow into flies and the cricket usually perishes.

Researchers were puzzled about how precise hearing ability could arise from a small ear structure. Normal animals detect and locate sounds using the interaural time difference (ITD) and the interaural level difference (ILD). The ITD is the difference in the time it takes sound to reach the ear. ILD is the difference in sound intensity measure between both ears. At maximum, the ITD would only reach about 1.5 microseconds and the ILD would be less than one decibel. These small values make it hard to sense the differences. To solve these issues, researchers studied the mechanical aspects of flies' ears. They found that they have a presternum structure linking both tympanal membranes that is critical in detecting sound and localization. The structure acts as a lever by transferring and amplifying vibrational energy between the membranes. After sound hits the membranes at different amplitudes, the presternum sets up symmetrical vibration modes through bending and rocking. This effect helps the nervous system distinguish which side the sound is coming from. Because the presternum acts as an intertympanal bridge, the ITD is increased from 1.5 us to 55 us and the ILD is increased from less than one decibel to over 10 decibels.

When looking at the nervous systems of flies, researchers found three auditory afferents. Type one fires only one spike to the stimulus onset, has low jitter (variability in timing over stimulus presentations), no spontaneous activity, and is the most common type. Type two fires two to four spikes to the stimulus onset, has increased jitter with subsequent spikes, and has low spontaneous activity. Finally, type three has tonic spiking to the presented stimulus, has low jitter only with the first spikes, has low spontaneous activity, and is the least common type. Researchers discovered that neurons responded the strongest to sound frequencies between 4 and 9 kHz, which includes the frequencies present in cricket songs. Also, neurons were found to have responded strongest at 4.5 kHz, which is the frequency of the Gryllus song. Despite the type of auditory afferent, all observed neurons revealed an inverse/latency relationship. The stronger the stimulus, the shorter the time until the neuron begins to respond. The difference in the number of afferents above the threshold on a side of the animal is called population code and can be used to account for sound localization.

=== Midshipman fish ===
Female midshipman fish undergo stimulus filtering when it comes time to mate with a male. Midshipman fish use stimulus filtering when listening to sounds produced by underwater species. Dominant signals underwater range between 60 and 120 Hz, which is the most normally the most sensitive to the fish's auditory receptor. However, the female auditory system changes seasonally to acoustical stimuli in the songs of male midshipman fish. In the summer when female midshipman fish are reproducing they listen to a male humming song that can be produce a frequency level of 400 Hz. The summer is reproducing season for the females so their hearing is more sensitive to the high frequency of the male humming.

== See also ==
- Multisensory integration
- Sensory processing
- Sensory processing disorder
- Auditory processing disorder
