= Audio processing =

Audio processing may refer to:

- Audio signal processing
- Auditory system, particularly in the context of auditory processing disorder
