= Sleep and emotions =

Emotions play a key role in overall mental health, and sleep plays a crucial role in maintaining the optimal homeostasis of emotional functioning. Deficient sleep, both in the form of sleep deprivation and restriction, adversely impacts emotion generation, emotion regulation, and emotional expression. People who fail to get enough sleep have a harder time controlling their emotions. Stress tolerance, patience and emotional reactivity are all negatively impacted by not enough or poor sleep. On the other hand having persistent stress and emotional distress can make it difficult to fall or stay asleep, which feeds back into a cycle of poor mood and lack of sleep.

== Models of sleep loss and emotional reactivity ==
Scientists offer two explanations for the effects of sleep loss on emotions. One explanation is that sleep loss causes disinhibition of emotional brain regions, leading to an overall increase in emotional intensity (also referred to as Dysregulation Model). The other explanation describes how sleep loss causes an increase in fatigue and sleepiness, coupled with an overall decrease in energy and arousal, leading to an overall decrease in emotional intensity (also referred to as Fatigue Model).

=== Neurobiological Mechanisms ===
Neurobiological evidence supports the connection between sleep and emotional regulation. REM (rapid eye movement) sleep, particularly helps the processing and incorporation of emotional memories by controlling neural activity in the amygdala, hippocampus, and prefrontal cortex. In a neurochemical setting that encourages memory consolidation and lessens the emotional intensity associated with those memories, the brain reactivates emotional experiences during REM sleep. Lack of sleep disrupts this process and had been linked to decreased functional connectivity between the amygdala and the prefrontal cortex, which controls emotions, as well as heightened amygdala activation in response to negative stimuli. Overactive emotional reactions, irritability and trouble managing stress are all influenced by this hyperactive and disconnected pattern.

=== The dysregulation model ===
The dysregulation model is supported by neuroanatomical, physiological, and subjective self-report studies. Emotional brain regions (e.g. the amygdala) have shown 60% greater reactivity to emotionally negative photographs following one night of sleep deprivation, as measured by functional magnetic resonance imaging. Five days of sleep restriction (four hour sleep opportunity per night) caused a decrease in connectivity with cortical brain regions involved in the regulation of the amygdala. Pupil diameter was shown to increase significantly in response to negative photographs following sleep deprivation. When exposed to positive stimuli, sleep deprived participants showed amplified emotional reactivity throughout various midbrain, striatal, limbic, and visual processing brain regions. One night of sleep deprivation caused participants to judge neutral images more negatively than non sleep deprived participants. One night of sleep loss also caused increased impulsivity to negative stimuli.

=== The fatigue model ===
The fatigue-model is supported by subjective self-report and physiological studies. Arousal, as measured by electroencephalograph (EEG), decreases as sleep loss increases, leading to a decrease in the desire to perform and exert effort. Short-term sleep loss is associated with blunting in the recognition of negative and positive facial expressions. Various forms of emotional expression, including facial and vocal expression, are adversely affected by sleep loss. Following one night of sleep deprivation, participants show decreased facial expressiveness in response to positive stimuli, as well as decreased vocal expression of positive emotion. Sleep deprivation slows the generation of facial reactions in response to emotional faces. One to two nights of sleep loss in healthy adults is associated with a decrease in the generated intensity of positive moods (i.e. happiness and activation), as well as an increase in the generated intensity of negative moods (i.e. anger, depression, fear, and fatigue). Long-term chronic exposure to insufficient sleep is associated with a decline in optimism and sociability, and an increase in subjective experiences of sleepiness and fatigue. Furthermore, sleep restricted to five hours a night over the course of a week causes significant increases in self-reports of subjective mood disturbance and sleepiness.

== Sleep, emotions, and psychiatric ailments ==
Deficient sleep patterns are prominent in many psychiatric ailments. Insomnia increases the risk of a depressive episode, sleep deprivation influences the onset of hypomania, and sleep disturbance contributes to the maintenance of mood disorders. Amongst manic bipolar patients, sleep loss may act as a trigger in the onset of a manic episode.

Sleep patterns are affected by behavioral and emotional disorders, and aspects of emotional and cognitive well-being are influenced by sleep patterns. Scientists have examined the effects of deficient sleep patterns on emotion regulation in individuals diagnosed with mental disorders ( e.g. depression and anxiety), borderline personality disorder, bipolar disorder, and panic disorder. Techniques like cognitive reappraisal (reframing negative events in a less distressing light) depend on sufficient sleep. When sleep is restricted, people and to rely more on maladaptive strategies such as suppression or rumination, which heighten emotional distress and increase vulnerability to anxiety and depression. Other methods typically include observational, subjective, behavioral, and physiological measures of emotional functioning.

Emotion regulation difficulties are associated with greater symptoms of depression, anxiety, and borderline personality, that worsen with poor sleep patterns. Heart rate variability (HRV) is described as the time interval between heartbeats, and is linked to emotion regulation capacity, with higher resting HRV is associated with greater emotion regulation capacity, and lower resting HRV is associated with low emotion regulation capacity. Physiological data suggests that HRV is negatively affected by sleep loss, as seen in panic disorder patients with poor sleep quality who display increased cognitive inhibition due to reduced HRV. Emotion dysregulation has also been shown to play a role in the maintenance of generalized anxiety disorder, panic disorder, obsessive-compulsive disorder, and posttraumatic stress disorder. Overall deficient sleep plays a role in dampening emotions in clinical populations already susceptible to emotion dysregulation, as well as maintaining various psychiatric conditions through contributing to emotion dysfunction.

=== Interpersonal and social impacts ===
Lack of sleep has serious social repercussions in addition to its effect on individuals. According to studies, sleep deprivation diminishes empathy and makes it more difficult to identify and decipher others' emotional cues and facial expressions. It can also cause people to misinterpret neutral or positive interactions as hostile or dangerous, which can result in miscommunication and conflict between people. Additionally, inadequate sleep can decreases prosocial behaviors like cooperation and helping and increase social disengagement. These consequences have the potential to weaken connections with others and impact relationships over time, highlighting the significance of sleep for both emotional health and preserving strong social ties.

=== Children, adolescents and emotional Development ===
Several important emotional characteristics that develop in childhood have been linked to sleep quality and duration, for example approachability, adaptability and attachment. Sleep disruption has been argued to play a role in crying frequency. Crying was interpreted as an early form of a behavioral dysregulation and has therefore been linked to emotion regulation. During adolescence, a time marked by increased social and emotional challenges, sleep is crucial for emotional growth. Mood swings, irritability, anxiety, and depressive symptoms are more common in adolescences who routinely receive inadequate sleep. According to longitudinal studies, prolonged sleep deprivation during adolescence is associated with a higher risk of emotional dysregaltion and the emergence of affective disorders in later life. therefore encouraging sound sleeping practices during this critical phase can be a crucial mental health preventive strategy.

== Dreaming as a Mood-Regulation System ==
It is hypothesized that dreaming might be a way of improving mood in non-clinical populations. The evidence for this phenomenon has been collected from home dream reports in psychotherapy and from laboratory dreams collected after waking a participant in a REM sleep phase. Adults often remember dreams which have a negative emotional component, whereby women recall more dreams than men and dream recall is associated with a higher level of anxiety and lighter sleep.

=== Dreams after Stress ===
In a study conducted with depressed and healthy adults and were able to show that in healthy subjects, dreaming was a way to positively influence mood and cope with stress at night. Dreams of depressed persons, however, might deteriorate their mood further. This study's interesting results are limited in generalizability due to the small sample and the lack of reported dreams by depressed patients.

Emotions are more apparent in stages of REM-sleep rather than other stages of sleep. It was found that during REM-sleep negative emotions diminish. After going through stages of REM-sleep, people with depression report feeling better, in a study done by Cartwright et al. Conversely, a theory proposed by Revonsuo states that when people experience negative emotions or negative events, when they sleep the REM-sleep replays such events, which is known as rehearsal. During REM-sleep areas of the brain, the suborbital area, and the cortical area are responsible for emotion but also a suppression of arousing emotions are activated. Scientists noticed a decrease in the hormone noradrenaline which is released into the body after a highly stimulating event. People reported trouble falling asleep or sleeping consistently throughout the night when a stressful event was happening in their life, as observed by Åkerstedt. REM-sleep aids people with negative emotion or high stress.

== Circadian Rhythm and Emotions ==
The circadian rhythm provides a person with a signal for when to sleep and when to wake up. If circadian rhythm and sleep-wake cycle are misaligned, this might lead to negative affect and emotional instability. It has been found that emotions vary depending on the circadian rhythm and the duration of how long one was awake. Circadian sleep-rhythm disorders like shift-work disorder or Jetlag-disorder have been found to similarly contribute to the Dysregulation of affect, with symptoms like irritability, anxiety, apathy and dysphoria. the coordinated function of brain systems involved in emotional regulation can be impaired by circadian rhythm disruptions, such as irregular sleep schedules, late night activities, or irregular wake times. These disruptions are associated with elevated levels of stress hormones such as cortisol, impair mood stability, and heightened irritability. Emotional and cognitive functioning are supported by maintaining regular sleep and wake times.
