= SoundBite Hearing System =

Bone-conducting hearing aid

SoundBite Hearing System is a non-surgical bone conduction prosthetic device that transmits sound via the teeth. It is an alternative to surgical bone conduction prosthetic devices, which require surgical implantation into the skull to conduct sound.

SoundBite avoids surgery by using the teeth rather than the implanted component. As a result, it is frequently less expensive and less complicated than the common surgical procedures.

SoundBite Hearing System has two principal components: a behind-the-ear (BTE) microphone unit that is worn on the impaired ear and a removable, custom-made in-the-mouth (ITM) device worn on the upper, left or right back teeth. Both components have rechargeable batteries and a charger is included with the system.

The BTE microphone captures and processes sound, wirelessly transmitting signals to the ITM device. The ITM converts these signals into subtle sound vibrations, which travel through the teeth and skull bones to reach the functioning inner ear, bypassing potential outer or middle ear complications. The vibrations are strong enough to be detected by the cochlea but remain imperceptible to the wearer.

In the United States, the device has FDA clearance to treat patients with single-sided deafness (SSD) or conductive hearing loss (CHL). SoundBite also has CE mark approval for SSD, CHL, and mixed hearing loss (MHL).

SoundBite was developed and marketed by Sonitus Medical, Inc. The company filed for bankruptcy on Thursday, January 15, 2015, as a result of the US Centres for Medicare & Medicaid Services' decision not to cover the device.

== History ==
Single-sided deafness (SSD) and conductive hearing loss (CHL) are life-altering conditions where patients often have anxiety, depression, social isolation, and reduced quality of life. SSD patients have one cochlea that is virtually non-functional. It does not hear sound even when using conventional hearing aids, which are amplification devices that simply "turn up the volume" on air-conducted sound. CHL patients have a problem with the ear (outer, middle or canal) that prohibits air conducted sound from reaching an otherwise functional cochlea. Conventional hearing aids which amplify sound can cause distortion for these patients. Therefore, the traditional treatment approach has been a prosthetic device called Baha, which replaces the function of the impaired ear by using a well-established principle called bone conduction to re-route sound through the skull bones to the functional cochlea.

The Baha bone conduction prosthetic devices are used rather than hearing aids because conventional hearing aids are clinically inappropriate for these patients. The Baha surgery can cause complications that range from skin reaction to infection, to abscess, to complete re-implantation or revision of the Baha post.

In the United States, the Medicare Benefit Policy Manual distinguishes between hearing aids and prosthetic devices, and indicates that certain devices (including Baha) are payable by Medicare as prosthetic devices when hearing aids are medically inappropriate.

The principle of bone conduction has been used for many years to treat patients with single-sided deafness and conductive hearing loss. The principle is based on decades of research showing that bone conduction stimulation of the teeth initiates auditory sensations. Evidence shows that teeth vibrations lead to audio-frequency vibration transmissions via soft tissue. Those transmissions then travel through skull foramina into the skull cavity. From there, they channel into the inner ear fluids, stimulating the cochlea. Subsequently, Sonitus Medical developed SoundBite Hearing System to use those principles in a non-surgical, removable hearing system.

== Clinical trials ==
A multi-centre clinical trial conducted in 2011 validated that SoundBite is safe and effective and provides substantial benefit for individuals with single-sided deafness (SSD). Trial participants wore SoundBite for 30 days, using the device an average of 8.2 hours per day. Based on the clinical trial results, SoundBite improves the ability of individuals with SSD to understand speech in an environment with background noise by an average of 25%. One-third of the trial participants found that the system improved their hearing ability by more than 30%. The results of this extensive clinical trial showed SoundBite to be as effective as surgically implanted bone conduction systems in improving the ability to understand speech in an environment with background noise.

In 2013, another multi-centre clinical study confirmed previous findings that SoundBite is safe, effective, and provides significant benefit for patients. Study participants wore SoundBite for 6 month. Benefit was determined through a standard audiological questionnaire called the Abbreviated Profile of Hearing Aid Benefit (APHAB), and a patient survey. Results from the APHAB questionnaire showed patients had significant improvement in Ease of Communication, Reverberation, Background Noise, and Global Benefit. Additionally, the patient survey showed strong satisfaction with the device: 100% would recommend SoundBite to a friend or family member with similar hearing loss.

== Description ==
Sound vibrations travel through a medium, and sound is heard when sound waves travel through the medium of air or bones/teeth to arrive at the inner ears. The SoundBite Hearing System uses sound waves travelling through bone, known as bone conduction to transmit subtle vibrations through bones to the inner ears.

The SoundBite Hearing System is a non-surgical and removable bone conduction hearing prosthetic device that re-routes sound through the teeth and skull bone directly to the functioning inner ear or cochlea. By-passing problems in the outer and middle ears entirely. For patients with single-sided deafness, SoundBite re-routes sound from the deaf side, to the functioning cochlea, by-passing the non-hearing side.

SoundBite uses the same mechanism of action as Baha devices (bone conduction), however it places a transducer on the tooth —a "naturally Osseo integrated" post—and thereby eliminates the need for a surgical implant.

SoundBite relies on two primary components to deliver sound:

- The behind-the-ear (BTE) microphone unit is worn on the patient's deaf ear. Using the natural acoustic benefits of the outer ear, sound is collected and channelled into the ear canal. A tiny microphone is placed within the canal of the impaired ear and is connected by a small tube to the BTE. The BTE uses a digital signal processor to process the sound and a wireless chip to transmit the sound signals to the in-the-mouth (ITM) device.
- The ITM device is customized for each patient to fit around the upper, left or right, back teeth. The ITM picks up the signals from the BTE and converts them into subtle vibrations that travel via the teeth, through bone, and to the cochlea. Once these sound vibrations reach the inner ear, they are converted into auditory signals which are sent to the brain and are interpreted as sound.

The BTE unit has a 12-to-15-hour operational life when fully charged. Each ITM hearing device has a 6-to-8 hour operational life when fully charged. The SoundBite Hearing System includes 1 BTE, 2 ITMs, and a system charger.

The BTE unit delivers a broader frequency bandwidth (up to 18,000 Hz) as compared to existing devices for single-sided deafness. This broader bandwidth enhances spatial hearing ability, which is a key limitation for SSD patients.

== Treatment process ==
The patient is evaluated by an audiologist to determine degree of hearing loss to determine if the patient is a candidate for SoundBite. A dentist then performs a dental screening and takes a partial impression of the patient's teeth, which is used to create a customized SoundBite ITM device. The ITM and BTE are fitted and adjusted, and the system is programmed by a hearing professional.

=== Candidates and indications ===
In the United States, SoundBite is appropriate for patients who are 18 years or older, with good oral health, with:

- Single-sided deafness, defined as moderately severe, severe, or profound sensorineural hearing loss in one ear (problems with the inner ear), with normal hearing in the other ear
- Conductive hearing loss (problems with the outer or middle ear)
- In Europe and Canada, SoundBite is appropriate for patients who are 18 years or older, with good oral health, with:
- Single-sided deafness, defined as moderately severe, severe, or profound sensorineural hearing loss in one ear (problems with the inner ear), with normal hearing in the other ear
- Conductive hearing loss (problems with the outer or middle ear)
- Mixed hearing loss (problems with the inner and outer or middle ear)

== Manufacturer ==
The SoundBite Hearing System was manufactured by Sonitus Medical Inc., a privately held medical device company based in San Mateo, California founded in June 2006. In addition to receiving FDA clearance for SoundBite, Sonitus Medical has received CE Mark certification. The company filed for bankruptcy in January 2015 leaving users with no service and many who paid for these expensive devices never received them. Other companies have looked into buying them out but to date nobody has.
