= Unilateral hearing loss =

- Other names: Single-sided deafness (SSD)
- Specialty: Audiology, ear, nose, and throat

Unilateral hearing loss (UHL) is a type of hearing impairment where there is normal hearing in one ear and impaired hearing in the other ear.

== Signs and symptoms ==
Patients with unilateral hearing loss have difficulty:

- Hearing conversation on their impaired side
- Localizing sound
- Understanding speech in the presence of background noise
- In interpersonal interaction in social settings
- Focusing on individual sound sources in large, open environments
- Heavy impairment of the auditory Figure–ground perception

In quiet conditions, speech discrimination is no worse than normal hearing in those with partial deafness; however, in noisy environments speech discrimination is almost always severe.

The prevalence is 3–8.3% of the population. Individuals who are diagnosed with Single Sided Deafness have difficulties with sound localization and speech in noise discrimination. Children with SSD are more likely to experience developmental delays- school, speech, behavioral problems.

== Causes ==
Known causes include genetics, maternal illness and injury. Examples of these causes are physical trauma, acoustic neuroma, maternal prenatal illness such as measles, labyrinthitis, microtia, meningitis, Ménière's disease, Waardenburg syndrome, mumps (epidemic parotitis), mastoiditis or due to an overstrained nervus vestibulocochlearis after a brain surgery too close to the nerve.

SSD's most severe form of unilateral hearing loss is caused by: sudden sensorineural hearing loss (SSNHL), acoustic neuroma, anomalies inner ear abnormalities, cochlear nerve deficiency (CND), mumps, congenital cytomegalovirus (CMV) infection, meningitis and auditory neuropathy spectrum disorder (ANSD) treatment is based on the cause of the hearing loss. Limited treatment when the cause is the Central auditory system or Auditory nerve.

== Prevalence ==
A 1998 study of schoolchildren found that per thousand, 6–12 had some form of unilateral hearing loss and 0–5 had moderate to profound unilateral hearing loss. It was estimated that in 1998 some 391,000 school-aged children in the United States had unilateral hearing loss.

== Profound unilateral hearing loss ==
Profound unilateral hearing loss is a specific type of hearing loss when one ear has no functional hearing ability (91 dB or greater hearing loss). People with profound unilateral hearing loss can only hear in monaural (mono).

Profound unilateral hearing loss or single-sided deafness, SSD, makes hearing comprehension very difficult. With speech and background noise presented at the same level, persons with unilateral deafness were found to listen only about 30–35% of the conversation. A person with SSD needs to make more effort when communicating with others. When a patient can hear from only one ear, and there are limited possibilities to compensate for the disability, e.g., changing listening position, group discussions and dynamic listening situations become difficult. Individuals with profound unilateral hearing loss are often perceived as socially awkward due to constant attempts to maximize hearing leading to socially unique body language and mannerisms.

UHL also negatively affects hearing and comprehension by making it impossible for the patient to determine the direction, distance and movement of sound sources. In an evaluation using the Speech, Spatial and Qualities of Hearing Scale (SSQ) questionnaire, SSD results in a greater handicap than subjects with a severe hearing loss in both ears.

Profound SSD is often confused with sensory discrimination disorder (SDD), a type of sensory processing disorder, and can lead to incorrect processing of sensory information or auditory input during interpersonal communications.

== Treatment ==
Several hearing devices have been shown to benefit individuals with unilateral hearing loss.

Contralateral Routing of Signals (CROS) hearing aids are hearing aids that take sound from the ear with poorer hearing and transmit to the ear with better hearing. They consist of a microphone placed near the impaired ear and an amplifier (hearing aid) near the normal ear. The two units are connected either by a wire behind the neck or by wireless transmission. The aid appears as two behind-the-ear hearing aids and is sometimes incorporated into eyeglasses.

Bone Anchored Hearing Aids (BAHAs) are bone conduction devices that are surgically implanted into the mastoid bone, with an abutment protruding through the skin. The external hearing aid clicks onto the abutment and uses bone conduction to transmit sound to the cochlea of the normal hearing ear. The external component can also be attached to a headband or softband and used as a non-surgical device.

The BONEBRIDGE bone conduction implant is surgically implanted into the mastoid bone completely underneath the skin. The audio processor is worn externally and held in place by magnets. It sends sound as electrical signals through the skin to the implant. The implant then sends sound vibrations to the cochlea of the normal hearing ear through the skull via bone conduction.

The ADHEAR bone conduction system is a non-surgical device that sticks to the skin behind the ear. It vibrates to send sound vibrations through the skin and the skull bone to the cochlea of the normal hearing ear.

The SoundBite intraoral bone conduction system used bone conduction via the teeth. One component resembled a conventional behind-the-ear hearing aid that wirelessly connects to a second component worn in the mouth that resembles a conventional dental appliance. The device was discontinued in 2015 and is no longer available.

A cochlear implant can also be used to treat single-sided deafness (SSD) and asymmetric hearing loss in many countries. The device is surgically implanted in the cochlea of the non-hearing ear, with a sound processor worn externally. Using electrical stimulation of the cochlea, sound is sent to the hearing nerve and onto the brain.

In 2019, the U.S. Food and Drug Administration (FDA) approved Cochlear Implant Systems from MED-EL — including SYNCHRONY and SYNCHRONY 2 — for individuals aged 5 years and older with SSD or asymmetric hearing loss. This marked the first time cochlear implants were approved in the U.S. for these specific indications, offering a new treatment option for patients who do not benefit from traditional amplification methods.

=== Evaluation ===
According to Snapp 2019, CROS technology solutions provide a noninvasive, aesthetically appealing, low-cost option for individuals with single sided deafness (SSD). The primary benefits of a CROS hearing devices are improved sound awareness from the impaired side and better hearing in noise when speech is located on the impaired side. However, CROS solutions do not provide restoration of binaural hearing and cannot improve tasks requiring binaural input, such as localization.

One study of the BAHA system showed a benefit depending on the patient's transcranial attenuation. Another study showed that sound localization was not improved, but the effect of the head shadow was reduced. The BAHA system has been shown to have higher patient satisfaction and greater perceived benefit by users than the CROS system.

The BONEBRIDGE system has been shown to provide good hearing outcomes, and patients also reported high subjective benefit. The device has been shown to decrease the head shadow effect. Sprinzl et al. (2016) also found that the BONEBRIDGE system had a lower complication rate when compared to other implanted bone conduction devices.

Studies of the ADHEAR system have shown that patients report higher comfort satisfaction and longer daily wearing times compared to the BAHA system with a headband or softband, due to the lack of pressure on the skin. Better outcomes compared to CROS hearing aids have also been reported.

Studies on the SoundBite system showed it to have strong hearing benefit and high patient satisfaction, particularly due to its non-surgical design. Some users reported acoustic feedback from the device.

Cochlear implants (CIs) have been shown to benefit patients with unilateral hearing loss in terms of tinnitus reduction, localization, speech understanding, and quality of life (QoL). The increased ability to locate sounds is explained by the fact that, unlike with the other treatments available, treating unilateral hearing loss with a cochlear implant results in both cochleae being stimulated, which helps the brain to better decipher the location of the sound. However, patients may still have difficulties at frontal locations and on the CI side.

== Other issues ==
School-age children with unilateral hearing loss may have poorer grades, be perceived to have behavioral issues, and require educational assistance.

When wearing stereo headphones, people with unilateral hearing loss can hear only one channel, hence the panning information (volume and time differences between channels) is lost; some instruments may be heard better than others if they are mixed predominantly to one channel, and in extreme cases of sound production, such as complete stereo separation or stereo-switching, only part of the composition can be heard; in games using 3D audio effects, sound may not be perceived appropriately due to coming to the disabled ear.

== See also ==
- Cocktail party effect
- SoundBite Hearing System
