= Cognitive inhibition =

Ability to tune out irrelevant stimuli

Cognitive inhibition refers to the mind's ability to tune out stimuli that are irrelevant to the task/process at hand or to the mind's current state. Additionally, it can be done either in whole or in part, intentionally or otherwise. Cognitive inhibition in particular can be observed in many instances throughout specific areas of cognitive science.

== History ==
The early models of what would become the study and concept of cognitive inhibition were developed by Sigmund Freud. Inhibition was believed to play two primary roles: the prevention of unwanted thoughts or behaviors, and the repression of experiences from infancy and childhood. Freud believed cognitive inhibition was not just a lack of awareness to stimuli, but an active process, requiring a constant energy expenditure.

Other early theories of cognitive inhibition focused on its central developmental mechanisms and were founded by Luria and Vygotsky, two Russian psychologists. They proposed that children acquire control of behavior and thought through internalized speech, and that they consciously exhibit a cognitively inhibitory process in order to regulate their own behavior. Cognitive inhibition was thought to develop as mental control over behavior developed.

During the past 30 years inhibitory mechanisms such as cognitive inhibition have not been particularly prominent in developmental psychology, but currently they are undergoing a revival in the study of inefficient inhibition (explored in a later section) and resource limitations.

== Developmental psychology ==
Cognitive inhibition can be seen at work during studies in developmental psychology. An experiment done by Friedman and Leslie explained children's performance in the false belief task as relying on a critical inhibitory process. What this demonstrated is that reaching the age of 3 or 4 triggers cognitive inhibition ability formation. The idea is that children who are 3 or 4 can suppress information from their cognitive experience in order to evaluate a situation from another's point of view. This is very important developmentally as it may interact with the formation of empathy: cognitive inhibition cannot be so great as to completely block one's experiences while evaluating another point of view, but must be strong enough to enable an accurate representation of that point of view. Other elements of cognitive inhibition that are studied in developmental psychology include memory formation or memory inhibition. It has been demonstrated that intentional inhibition of memory commitment is not fully developed until adulthood, and is very difficult for children to accomplish. This illustrates the fact that cognitive inhibition tasks, such as those in memory processing, are a gradually acquired skill rather than instinctual. Other cognitive functions that are developed gradually throughout childhood include exercising self-control over retained representational structures of information and quickly adapting cognitive processing to changing behavioral situations. Both of these functions were determined to be present throughout development, but not at full capacity until young adulthood. Evidently, the ability to intentionally ignore irrelevant details and to focus attention and cognitive ability on more relevant details is not present in young children and is a highly developmentally-related process.

== Role in survival ==
Cognitive inhibition may have played a role in the survival of human children, in what is called betrayal trauma theory. "In situations involving treacherous acts by a caregiver, a 'cognitive information blockage' may occur that results in an isolation of knowledge of the event from awareness". This motivated forgetting caused by cognitive inhibition would have been necessary in the past to maintain the crucial relationship between child and caregiver so that the child would survive; therefore, cognitive inhibition has endured through evolution. For example, a parent or caregiver may have been abusive physically or emotionally to a child, perhaps not intentionally, but the effect would be the same to the child. However, the world outside the protection of the caregiver would be even less forgiving and almost certainly fatal to the child in ancient history. Being ontogenetically better able to cognitively inhibit the memory of the abuse to maintain the relationship became evolutionarily advantageous.

== Behavioral psychology ==
Behavioral psychology may play an important part in the development of cognitive inhibition. Cognitive inhibition is believed to strongly influence both sexual and aggressive urges within human society. When signals or stimuli are perceived by an individual, the mind processes the information and the body elicits a response. However, in the case of sexual arousal or perceived aggressive behavior, the individual needs to exercise caution in the cognitive processing of the incoming signals. This is where cognitive inhibition plays its part, preventing the individual from cognitively processing the stimuli and selecting an inappropriate response, thus potentially saving crucial social relationships. Behavior towards others in a social circle is strongly influenced by empathy, which can be seen as a form of cognitive inhibition. Empathy causes an individual to understand the physical/emotional pain and suffering of others. When an interaction occurs, cognitive inhibition on the part of the individual causes him or her to respond appropriately and avoid upsetting someone already in physical or emotional pain. Again, this is important in maintaining social relationships.

Behavioral control is an important application of cognitive inhibition in behavioral psychology, as is emotional control. Depression is an example of cognitive inhibition failure in emotion control. Correctly functioning cognitive inhibition would result in reduced selective attention to negative stimuli and retention of negative thoughts. "There is emerging evidence that depression is characterized by deficits in the inhibition of mood-congruent material. These deficits could result in prolonged processing of negative, goal-irrelevant aspects of presented information thereby hindering recovery from negative mood and leading to the sustained negative affect that characterizes depressive episodes". Anger is another important emotion affected by cognitive inhibition. "Trait anger is a robust predictor of the angry and aggressive response to hostile situational input, but it is important to better understand the mechanisms underlying this personality...individuals low in trait anger systematically recruit cognitive control resources within hostile contexts". When situations that may elicit anger leading to violence arise, cognitive inhibition is used extensively. Hostile stimuli magnitude are considered and ignored to avoid confrontation. Social context situations that may be interpreted as hostile are processed, and through cognitive inhibition, logic and reasoning are used to handle the situation. When a degree of cognitive inhibition ability is absent in an individual, it can result in "trait anger", or frequent angry and violent outbursts at relatively inoffensive stimuli. Without cognitive inhibition and its resulting omission of irrelevant or unimportant information, emotional stability can be compromised.

== Behavioral neuroscience ==
Behavioral neuroscience applies the principles of neurobiology, to the study of physiological, genetic, and developmental mechanisms of behavior. Cognitive inhibition is caused by several different interacting biological factors. The first is the existence of inhibitory neurotransmitters, or chemicals emitted by brain cells to both communicate and inhibit communication between each other. "GABA, an inhibitory transmitter substance that has been implicated in certain simple behavioral measures of inhibition and the control of aggressive behavior, was discovered in the cerebral cortex in substantial quantities". Given the cerebral cortex's importance in many brain functions such as memory and thought, the presence of the inhibitory substance GABA supports the cognitive inhibition processes that go on in this area of the brain. Serotonin and dopamine, which can play inhibitory roles as well, are present in the brain in large quantities. All three of these neurotransmitters are capable of "blocking" the transmissions between neurons, which can ultimately result in cognitive inhibition. In addition, the presence of inhibitory connections in the central nervous system has been firmly demonstrated (Eccles, 1969). A process known as lateral inhibition, which involves the capacity of an excited neuron to reduce the activity of its neighbors, is integral in the biology of cognitive inhibition. It provides much of the neural background behind it and explains what exactly is going on at the cellular level.

== Theory of inefficient inhibition ==
Many contemporary cognitive theorists postulate models featuring a central pool "of mental resources that must be allocated to the various operations involved in processing, retaining, and reporting information". This means that working memory and the various areas of the brain responsible for it are theoretically limited to a finite set of "mental resources" or mental capacity with which to carry out operation. Cognitive inhibition, of course, is responsible for determining what is relevant to the working memory and shuts out what is irrelevant, "freeing up space" and mental capacity needed for more pressing matters.
In the theory of inefficient inhibition, cognitive inhibition does not perform its function fully, and a shortage of mental resources leads to decreased performance or inefficiency in tasks that require more mental capacity. While inefficient inhibition can result naturally in individuals diagnosed with mild cognitive impairment, this effect is especially pronounced in methamphetamine-dependent individuals. Clinically, these individuals can be highly distractible and exhibit difficulty focusing, which illustrates the fact that cognitive inhibition is being impaired and that inefficient inhibition is resulting. Because of the nature of the psychoactive drug, the brain is unable or reduced in its capacity to shut out irrelevant stimuli to the task at hand, and so tries to process and respond to any and all stimuli.

== Failure and deficits ==
If an individual experiences impaired or damaged cognitive inhibition abilities, the psychological results can be extremely debilitating. Patients with obsessive–compulsive disorder (OCD) can experience the effects of reduced cognitive inhibition. "Failures of inhibition were identified in treatment of adults with OCD. In Go/No-Go tasks, subjects have to make a simple motor response (such as pressing a button) as quickly as possible when target stimuli are presented, and withhold the motor response when non-target stimuli are presented. Bannon et al. (2002) found that OCD patients made significantly more commission errors than matched panic disorder control subjects in a computerized task necessitating the inhibition of responses on a proportion of trials— OCD patients tended to make inappropriate motor responses to non-target stimuli." Evidently, the cognitive inhibition that OCD patients experience can have such effects as impairing response time to significant stimuli and decreasing the ability to shut out irrelevant stimuli. This may be why OCD responses to certain stimuli can be difficult to control. Suicidal behavior may also be related to impaired cognitive inhibition. In one meta-analysis involving 164 studies, it was discovered that executive dysfunction and higher cognitive inhibition deficit is positively correlated and more frequently found among patients with suicidal behaviors. In attention deficit hyperactivity disorder (ADHD), studies of cognitive control have not emphasized the ability to actively suppress pre-potent mental representations. This indicates that people diagnosed with ADHD experience an impaired cognitive inhibition ability and find it difficult to suppress irrelevant stimuli. The result is decreased mental representation control and perhaps a degree of working memory deficit. Finally, there are age-related effects on an individual's ability to execute cognitive inhibition, which mostly include language impairment. "In language production, older adults' increased word-finding deficits have been explained under inhibitory deficit theory as a consequence of their reduced ability to inhibit irrelevant words (competitors) that impair retrieval of the target." When speaking, many older adults experience difficulty "finding" the words they want to use, which is evidence of cognitive inhibition skills not functioning properly. Because they are not omitting synonyms or replacements entirely from their working memory (which can be considered irrelevant stimuli), they exhibit similar types of mental representation degradation that patients with depression, ADHD, or OCD indicate.
