= Bertram Gawronski =

German social psychologist (born 1971)

- Born: October 22, 1971 (age 54); Würzburg, Germany
- Education: Free University Berlin (MA); Humboldt University Berlin (PhD)
- Known for: Associative-Propositional Evaluation Model, CNI Model of Moral Decision-Making
- Scientific career
- Fields: Psychology (social)
- Workplaces: University of Western Ontario; University of Texas at Austin

Bertram Gawronski is a social psychologist and professor of psychology at the University of Texas at Austin. He is known for his research in the areas of attitudes, social cognition, decision making, and moral psychology.

== Biography ==
Bertram Gawronski earned his MA in philosophy at the Free University of Berlin (Germany) in 1998 and his PhD in psychology at Humboldt University of Berlin (Germany) in 2001. From 2001 to 2002 Gawronski worked as a Postdoctoral Fellow with Fritz Strack at the University of Würzburg (Germany) and from 2002 to 2004 with Galen Bodenhausen at Northwestern University (US). In 2004, he accepted a position as assistant professor at the University of Western Ontario in London, Ontario (Canada), where he was awarded a Canada Research Chair in 2005. He was promoted to the rank of associate professor in 2008 and to the rank of professor in 2010. Since January 2014, he is professor of psychology at the University of Texas at Austin, where he held the David Wechsler Regents Chair in Psychology from 2015 to 2020.

== Research ==
Gawronski's research investigates the mental processes underlying social judgments and social behavior. A central focus of his research concerns the interplay of automatic and controlled processes in attitudes, social cognition, and decision making.

Gawronski's most influential work is the associative-propositional evaluation (APE) model (developed in collaboration with Galen Bodenhausen), a dual process theory that specifies the relation between explicit and implicit evaluations. A central assumption of the APE model is that spontaneous "implicit" evaluations and deliberate "explicit" evaluations are the product of two functionally distinct mental processes. Whereas implicit evaluations are assumed to be the outcome of associative processes, explicit evaluations are assumed to be the outcome of propositional processes. Associative processes are conceptualized as the activation of associations on the basis of feature similarity and spatio-temporal contiguity during learning. Propositional processes are defined as the validation of activated information on the basis of basic principles of cognitive consistency. The APE model has been instrumental in explaining diverging patterns of attitude change, including (a) changes in implicit but not explicit evaluations, (b) changes in explicit but not implicit evaluations, (c) corresponding changes in implicit and explicit evaluations, and (d) opposite changes in implicit and explicit evaluations. In 2011, the Council of Canadian Academies identified Gawronski and Bodenhausen's first article on the APE model as one of the 1% most frequently cited psychology papers worldwide published during the period of 2000–2008. Since its publication in 2006, this article has been cited more than 3000 times.

In 2008, Gawronski's research received widespread attention in the popular media with a study that predicted future decisions of undecided voters by means of an implicit-association test (conducted in collaboration with Silvia Galdi and Luciano Arcuri at the University of Padova, Italy). The findings fueled debates about whether people can make decisions outside of conscious awareness. In 2012, follow-up research by Gawronski and his colleagues qualified such a strong interpretation by showing that undecided individuals selectively search for information that is consistent with their implicit preferences, which in turn provides the basis for conscious decisions.

Another influential line of research by Gawronski investigated the generalization versus contextualization of implicit evaluations (conducted in collaboration with Robert Rydell at Indiana University, US, Bram Vervliet at the Katholieke Universiteit Leuven, Belgium, and Jan De Houwer Ghent University, Belgium). The research was inspired by inconsistent findings showing that implicit evaluations can be highly robust and difficult to change, highly malleable and easy to change, and highly context-dependent. To account for these disparate findings, Gawronski and his colleagues developed a learning theory that specifies the contextual conditions under which implicit evaluations reflect (a) initially learned attitudinal information, (b) subsequently learned counterattitudinal information, or (c) a mixture of both. Corresponding to similar patterns found in animal learning, the theory predicts that implicit evaluations tend to reflect the valence of counterattitudinal information only in the context in which this information was learned, and the valence of initial experiences in any other context. The findings received widespread attention for their implications on the stability of first impressions, suggesting that experiences that contradict a first impression are bound to the context in which they were made. Gawronski's work on these questions has been recognized with the Daniel M. Wegner Theoretical Innovation Prize by the Society for Personality and Social Psychology and the Best Social Cognition Paper Award by the International Social Cognition Network.

In the area of moral psychology, Gawronski's research has made significant contributions to understanding the processes underlying responses in moral dilemmas that pit the consequences of a given action for the greater good (utilitarianism) against the consistency of the action with moral norms (deontology). A commonly used scenario in this research is the trolley problem, in which a runaway trolley is approaching a group of workers who would be killed unless the trolley is redirected to a different track where it would kill only one person instead of five. Whereas judgments favoring this action have been described as utilitarian because they maximize the greater good, judgments opposing this action have been described as deontological because they are consistent with the moral norm that one should not kill other people. Together with Paul Conway, Gawronski developed a process dissociation model to disentangle the independent contributions of utilitarian and deontological inclinations to moral dilemma judgments. Expanding on this work, Gawronski and colleagues developed a multinomial model called the CNI model, which quantifies (a) sensitivity to consequences, (b) sensitivity to moral norms, and (c) general preference for inaction over action in responses to moral dilemmas.

== Honors and awards ==
- 2004: Early Career Award for the Best Article in the European Journal of Social Psychology, European Association of Social Psychology
- 2005: Canada Research Chair in Social Psychology, Canada Research Chairs Program
- 2006: Theoretical Innovation Prize, Society for Personality and Social Psychology
- 2006: Elected Fellow in Recognition of Substantial Contributions to Social Psychology, Society of Experimental Social Psychology
- 2007: Early Career Award, International Social Cognition Network
- 2007: Early Researcher Award, Ontario Ministry of Research and Innovation
- 2008: Charlotte-and-Karl-Bühler Prize, German Psychological Society
- 2009: Faculty Scholar Award in Recognition of Outstanding Contributions in Research, Teaching, and Service, University of Western Ontario
- 2010: Canada Research Chair in Social Psychology (Renewal), Canada Research Chairs Program
- 2011: Elected Fellow in Recognition of Sustained and Outstanding Contributions to Psychological Science, Association for Psychological Science
- 2011: Elected Fellow in Recognition of Significant Contributions to the Science of Psychology, Midwestern Psychological Association
- 2013: Career Trajectory Award, Society of Experimental Social Psychology
- 2013: Elected Fellow in Recognition of Outstanding Contributions to Personality and Social Psychology, Society for Personality and Social Psychology
- 2014: Best Social Cognition Paper Award, International Social Cognition Network
- 2014: Daniel M. Wegner Theoretical Innovation Prize, Society for Personality and Social Psychology
- 2015: David Wechsler Regents Chair in Psychology, University of Texas at Austin
- 2021: Diener Award in Social Psychology, Society for Personality and Social Psychology

== Edited books ==
- Deutsch, R., Gawronski, B., & Hofmann, W. (Eds). (2017). Reflective and impulsive determinants of human behavior. New York: Psychology Press.
- Gawronski, B., & Bodenhausen, G. V. (Eds.). (2015). Theory and explanation in social psychology. New York: Guilford Press.
- Gawronski, B., & Payne, B. K. (Eds.). (2010). Handbook of implicit social cognition: Measurement, theory, and applications. New York: Guilford Press.
- Gawronski, B., & Strack, F. (Eds.). (2012). Cognitive consistency: A fundamental principle in social cognition. New York: Guilford Press.
- Sherman, J. W., Gawronski, B., & Trope, Y. (Eds.). (2014). Dual-process theories of the social mind. New York: Guilford Press.

== Representative publications ==
- Conrey, F. R., Sherman, J. W., Gawronski, B., Hugenberg, K., & Groom, C. (2005). Separating multiple processes in implicit social cognition: The Quad-Model of implicit task performance. Journal of Personality and Social Psychology, 89, 469–487.
- Conway, P., & Gawronski, B. (2013). Deontological and utilitarian inclinations in moral decision-making: A process dissociation approach. Journal of Personality and Social Psychology, 104, 216–235.
- De Houwer, J., Gawronski, B., & Barnes-Holmes, D. (2013). A functional-cognitive framework for attitude research. European Review of Social Psychology, 24, 252–287.
- Deutsch, R., Gawronski, B., & Strack, F. (2006). At the boundaries of automaticity: Negation as reflective operation. Journal of Personality and Social Psychology, 91, 385–405.
- Galdi, S., Arcuri, L., & Gawronski, B. (2008). Automatic mental associations predict future choices of undecided decision-makers. Science, 321, 1100–1102.
- Galdi, S., Gawronski, B., Arcuri, L., & Friese, M. (2012). Selective exposure in decided and undecided individuals: Differential relations to automatic associations and conscious beliefs. Personality and Social Psychology Bulletin, 38, 559–569.
- Gawronski, B., Armstrong, J., Conway, P., Friesdorf, R., & Hütter, M. (2017). Consequences, norms, and generalized inaction in moral dilemmas: The CNI model of moral decision-making. Journal of Personality and Social Psychology, 113, 343–376.
- Gawronski, B., Balas, R., & Creighton, L. A. (2014). Can the formation of conditioned attitudes be intentionally controlled? Personality and Social Psychology Bulletin, 40, 419–432.
- Gawronski, B., & Bodenhausen, G. V. (2005). Accessibility effects on implicit social cognition: The role of knowledge activation and retrieval experiences. Journal of Personality and Social Psychology, 89, 672–685.
- Gawronski, B., & Bodenhausen, G. V. (2006). Associative and propositional processes in evaluation: An integrative review of implicit and explicit attitude change. Psychological Bulletin, 132, 692–731.
- Gawronski, B., & Bodenhausen, G. V. (2007). Unraveling the processes underlying evaluation: Attitudes from the perspective of the APE Model. Social Cognition, 25, 687–717.
- Gawronski, B., & Bodenhausen, G. V. (2011). The associative-propositional evaluation model: Theory, evidence, and open questions. Advances in Experimental Social Psychology, 44, 59–127.
- Gawronski, B., & Cesario, J. (2013). Of mice and men: What animal research can tell us about context effects on automatic responses in humans. Personality and Social Psychology Review, 17, 187–215.
- Gawronski, B., Hofmann, W., & Wilbur, C. J. (2006). Are "implicit" attitudes unconscious? Consciousness and Cognition, 15, 485–499.
- Gawronski, B., & LeBel, E. P. (2008). Understanding patterns of attitude change: When implicit measures show change, but explicit measures do not. Journal of Experimental Social Psychology, 44, 1355–1361.
- Gawronski, B., LeBel, E. P., & Peters, K. R. (2007). What do implicit measures tell us? Scrutinizing the validity of three common assumptions. Perspectives on Psychological Science, 2, 181–193.
- Gawronski, B., Peters, K. R., Brochu, P. M., & Strack, F. (2008). Understanding the relations between different forms of racial prejudice: A cognitive consistency perspective. Personality and Social Psychology Bulletin, 34, 648–665.
- Gawronski, B., Rydell, R. J., Vervliet, B., & De Houwer, J. (2010). Generalization versus contextualization in automatic evaluation. Journal of Experimental Psychology: General, 139, 683–701.
- Gawronski, B., & Strack, F. (2004). On the propositional nature of cognitive consistency: Dissonance changes explicit, but not implicit attitudes. Journal of Experimental Social Psychology, 40, 535–542.
- Gawronski, B., & Walther, E. (2012). What do memory data tell us about the role of contingency awareness in evaluative conditioning? Journal of Experimental Social Psychology, 48, 617–623.
- Hofmann, W., Gawronski, B., Gschwendner, T., Le, H., & Schmitt, M. (2005). A meta-analysis on the correlation between the Implicit Association Test and explicit self-report measures. Personality and Social Psychology Bulletin, 31, 1369–1385.
- Langer, T., Walther, E., Gawronski, B., & Blank, H. (2009). When linking is stronger than thinking: Associative transfer of valence disrupts the emergence of cognitive balance after attitude change. Journal of Experimental Social Psychology, 45, 1232–1237.
- Ouimet, A. J., Gawronski, B., & Dozois, D. J. A. (2009). Cognitive vulnerability to anxiety: A review and an integrative model. Clinical Psychology Review, 29, 459–470.
- Peters, K. R., & Gawronski, B. (2011). Are we puppets on a string? Comparing the impact of contingency and validity on implicit and explicit evaluations. Personality and Social Psychology Bulletin, 37, 557–569.
- Peters, K. R., & Gawronski, B. (2011). Mutual influences between the implicit and explicit self-concepts: The role of memory activation and motivated reasoning. Journal of Experimental Social Psychology, 47, 436–442.
- Sherman, J. W., Gawronski, B., Gonsalkorale, K., Hugenberg, K., Allen, T. J., & Groom, C. J. (2008). The self-regulation of automatic associations and behavioral impulses. Psychological Review, 115, 314–335.

== See also ==
- List of psychologists
