= Bodenhausen =

Bodenhausen is a surname. Notable people with the surname include:

- Erpo Freiherr von Bodenhausen (1897–1945), German World War II general
- Galen Bodenhausen (born 1961), American social psychologist
- Geoffrey Bodenhausen (born 1951), French chemist
- Georg Bodenhausen, Dutch civil servant
