= Implicit attitude =

Evaluations that occur without conscious awareness

Implicit attitudes are evaluations that occur without conscious awareness towards an attitude object or the self. These evaluations are generally either favorable or unfavorable and come about from various influences in the individual experience. The commonly used definition of implicit attitude within cognitive and social psychology comes from Anthony Greenwald and Mahzarin Banaji's template for definitions of terms related to implicit cognition: (Note: See also implicit stereotype and implicit self-esteem for usage of this template.) "Implicit attitudes are introspectively unidentified (or inaccurately identified) traces of past experience that mediate favorable or unfavorable feeling, thought, or action toward social objects". These thoughts, feelings or actions have an influence on behavior that the individual may not be aware of.

An attitude is differentiated from the concept of a stereotype in that it functions as a broad favorable or unfavorable characteristic towards a social object, whereas a stereotype is a set of favorable and/or unfavorable characteristics which are applied to an individual based on social group membership.

The following article will first discuss the potential causes and manifestations of implicit attitudes, specifically about social and cognitive aspects. It will then include the influence of awareness, as well as the debate on implicit attitude change. It will also present common measures (such as the Implicit Association Test, IAT), as well as their limitations. It will also include research that investigates the influence it has on behavior, as well as comparison and association with explicit attitudes.

== Causes and manifestations ==
A number of different theories have been proposed relating to the formation, development, and influence of implicit attitudes.

=== Halo effect ===
Based on many empirical findings, Greenwald and Banaji et al. (1995) generated the fundamental idea of implicit attitude definitively for the first time, disambiguating attitude into explicit and implicit types. Halo effects are an example of the empirical research used by Greenwald and Banaji in their chapter on implicit social cognition. Understanding halo effects set the foundation for understanding other theories regarding implicit attitudes. For example, it is possible to explain implicit partisanship or implicit egotism in terms of a halo effect, however these concepts will be discussed more in subsequent sections.

Pioneered by Edward Thorndike in 1920, the halo effect is the judgement of attribute "A" being influenced by a known but irrelevant attribute "B". For example, subsequent replications commonly use physical attractiveness as attribute "B" and attribute "A" being a judgement of the subject. More specifically a study Landy and Sigall et al. (1974) found that essays written by female essayists were found to be of higher quality when a photo showed the essayist as being attractive (rather than unattractive) when rated by male judges.

Greenwald and Banaji et al. (1995) have suggested that attribute "B" is in fact an implicit attitude when the judge or subject cannot identify attribute "B" as the source of the judgement for "A". Moreover, when attribute "B" is associated with a positive or negative attitude and additionally is unknowingly and automatically transferred onto attribute "A", that attitude of attribute "B" is known to be an implicit attitude.

However, the halo effect has several limitations. It can distort judgment, leading to unfair or inappropriate decisions. For instance, an individual's attractiveness might unjustifiably influence perceptions of their intelligence or trustworthiness. The horn effect, which is the opposite of the halo effect, states that a negative impression in one area leads to disproportionally negative evaluations in others. For example, if a product fails to meet expectations, consumers might negatively judge the entire brand's offerings. Together, these effects highlight how initial impressions, whether positive or negative, can bias subsequent judgments, often without conscious awareness, emphasizing the importance to recognize and resolve such cognitive biases in decision-making.

In our everyday lives, the halo effect is often applied in brand loyalty and equity, cultural and social domains, and educational settings. Companies often emphasize on the halo effect to enhance brand loyalty and equity. A positive experience with one product can lead consumers to favor other products from the same brand, even without direct experience. Moreover, the halo effect extends beyond individual perceptions, influencing societal norms and cultural standards. For example, celebrities can transfer their positive image to the product by endorsing them, affecting consumer behavior without evaluation of product quality. In addition, teachers' expectations on students' academic performance may be unconsciously influenced by a student's good behavior or appearance, which can lead to biased treatment.

=== Experiences and socialization ===
Earlier research findings on implicit attitudes show that socialization and reflections of past experiences may be responsible for the development or manifestation of longer lasting implicit attitudes. As an example, a 2004 study found that individuals who were primarily raised by their mothers showed a more positive implicit attitude towards women rather than men. Furthermore, Olson and Fazio et al. in 2001 and 2002 suggested that these implicit attitudes are a result of repeated pairings of positive or negative stimuli with an object; more pairings of positive stimuli would result in a more positive implicit attitude and vice versa. This finding supports the fundamental principles of classical conditioning.

Implicit attitudes are also developed by more recent experiences as well. For example, Rudmore, Ashmore, & Gary et al. in 2001 found that implicit attitude of prejudice against African Americans could be shaped through diversity training intervention using variables at an emotional level rather than increased awareness of bias which helped explicit attitude more.

=== Implicit attitudes related to the self ===
Self-related objects are anything that pertains to the self; including in-groups and self-esteem (attitude towards the self).

Early research by Nuttin et al. in 1985 suggested that people generally have an implicit preference for letters in their own name, known as the Name letter effect. Further replications of this same effect with varying independent variables (e.g., attractiveness to people with the same letters contained in their names) suggest that people have an implicit preference towards themselves. This manifestation of implicit attitude has come to be known as Implicit egotism. Implicit egotism additionally manifests itself in in-groups.

Implicit partisanship is the heightened attractiveness and identification to a self-related group and negative or neutral attitudes towards non-self-related groups. Greenwald, Pickrell, and Farnham et al. demonstrated this effect in 2002, even when the groups were cooperative and when the members of the groups were non-human. Much of the research on implicit partisanship suggests that this is an uncontrollable process, or an implicit attitude towards self-related groups.

=== Culture and social norms ===
Generally speaking, culture and social norms have an effect on implicit attitude in the same way experiences and socialization have an effect on implicit attitude. However, culture has a very noticeable effect on implicit attitude in the way implicit attitude differs from one's explicit attitude. In 2002, Livingston et al. examined the effect of mainstream culture on one's implicit attitude towards their social group. Implicitly, one will follow the cultural attitudes towards their social group that they perceive from mainstream culture in their society whether that be positive or negative. With that said, a strong cultural disadvantage (e.g., negative attitude) can effectively eliminate in-group favoritism when tested at the implicit level. However it may be important to note that at the explicit attitude level, these individuals still showed positive attitudes towards their social group. Olson and Fazio et al. suggested in 2004 that at an implicit level one's personal attitude can be influenced by the social or cultural norms that one perceives. Furthermore, this may be due to a weak distinction between one's personal attitude and extrapersonal associations (e.g., one's cultural evaluations) towards an attitude object at the implicit level. Therefore, implicit attitudes are reflective of experiences but can also be shaped by the cultural context.

In addition, media portrayals and upbringing significantly contribute to the formation of implicit biases. Continuous exposure to certain stereotypes in media can lead individuals to develop unconscious associations that align with those portrayals, and even reinforcing them, particularly within the criminal justice system. Similarly, cultural conditioning during upbringing can induce implicit biases that persist into adulthood, particularly in outgroup status perception. These influences demonstrate how deeply embedded social and cultural environments are in shaping implicit attitudes, often long before individuals are consciously aware of their effects.

== Degree of awareness ==
Current research supports the idea that there are three different aspects of attitudes captured by current indirect measures that could be outside of conscious awareness: the source, the content, and the impact of an attitude. Source awareness is described as the "awareness of the origin of a particular attitude" (emphasis added). For instance, understanding that a negative attitude toward a specific group stems from societal stereotypes reflects source awareness. Content awareness is differentiated from source awareness by the lack of awareness about the attitude, rather than simply its origin. In other words, it refers to being conscious of the attitude itself. While some implicit attitudes operate without conscious acknowledgment, research indicates that individuals can often predict their implicit biases, suggesting a degree of content awareness. Finally, one may have awareness of both the attitude and its source but the attitude may still have influences on thought or behavior beyond ones awareness; this can be thought of as impact awareness. Even when aware of an attitude and its source, individuals might not realize or fully understand their attitudes' effects on their actions. Conclusions have been made that both indirectly assessed and self-reported attitudes can be characterized by lack of source awareness, there is no evidence for lack of content awareness of indirectly assessed attitudes, and there is some evidence showing that indirectly assessed, but not self-reported, attitudes can be characterized by lack of impact awareness. The most compelling evidence for content awareness of implicit attitudes has shown that people are highly accurate in predicting their scores on the Implicit Association Test.

There are a few ongoing debates on implicit attitudes within the field. Some researchers argue that implicit attitudes function entirely outside of conscious awareness, influencing behavior without individuals' explicit recognition. This perspective suggests that people may hold biases they are unaware of, which can affect their judgments and actions unconsciously. Conversely, other scholars propose that individuals possess partial or even full awareness of their implicit attitudes. Evidence supporting this view includes studies where participants accurately predict their performance on implicit measures, such as the Implicit Association Test (IAT), indicating a conscious recognition of their biases. Furthermore, the relationship between implicit (unconscious) and explicit (conscious) attitudes is complex. While some studies find low correspondence between the two, suggesting a lack of awareness, others report significant correlations, implying that individuals might be aware of their implicit biases to some extent.

== Flexibility ==
=== Previous Research and Implicit Attitude Flexibility ===
Previous research has proposed that implicit research is difficult to change due to the quick, automatic retrieval of semantic information that is stored in long-term memory. This retrieval also occurs unconsciously, therefore it is harder to change.

=== Current Mechanisms of Implicit Attitude Change ===
Recent research indicates the possibility of the malleability of implicit attitudes based on situational context. That is, implicit attitudes are not believed to be stable representations of memory, rather they are constructed based on the type of available information in a given situation. Available information can vary in context to the individual, though it is believed to serve as a prime to their behaviors. Flexibility of implicit attitudes is best demonstrated through measures that include accessibility effects. For example, it has been demonstrated that the information given to an individual prior to completing an implicit measure directly affects their response based on the information they were given. Therefore, if an individual is primed with information regarding the positive, or negative, attributions of a different race and then asked to complete an implicit measures task, the participants will most likely use the information that was presented during the prime and not their own experienced information to assess the situation. This occurs because the information that was primed is most available for the participant to access without having to use conscious resources.

Another mechanism that changes implicit attitudes the acquisition of new impression information. Research has supported that after initial impression formation, counterattitudinal information acquisition may alter implicit attitudes. This type of implicit attitude change is more apparent when converting positive implicit attitude impressions to negative. These changes are slow and are a result of repeated substantial amounts of exposure to new negative counterattitudinal information. An exception to this pattern is if the negative attain information is perceived as extreme and rare. Once this type of information is exposed, immediate change in implicit attitudes was induced, thus negative implicit attitudes were documented.

The contact hypothesis suggests that meaningful intergroup contact between individuals from different groups for an extensive amount of time can lead to reduced negative implicit attitudes and prejudice. Some research has supported this notion, especially for racial implicit attitudes. Research has supported that when ingroup members had often contact with outgroup members for months, negative implicit attitudes and their associated emotions (such as anxiety) were reduced.

=== Duration of Implicit Attitude Change ===
Although there has been evidence that mechanisms such as intergroup contact and priming can change implicit measures, most changes are often brief. Most documented changes are during immediate retest of the mechanism, however long term sustained alterations are rare, especially if there was delay in between the retest and onset of mechanism.

== Effects on behavior ==
The fundamental goal of measuring implicit attitudes is to use it to predict behavior; behaviors that can't be predicted by knowledge of explicitly held attitudes. Numerous studies, such as research conducted by Chen and Bargh in 1999, show that automatic evaluations triggered by various attitudes towards objects directly affected behavioral predispositions towards that object. Stimuli that elicited positive attitudes produced immediate positive behavior whilst stimuli that elicited negative attitudes triggered immediate avoidance behavior. The individuals are completely unaware of the operations that their behavioral responses because they are automatic and unconscious. In Bassenoff and Sherman et al. (2000) they found that automatic negative attitudes about overweight individuals directly predicted how far participants choose to sit from a fat woman, who they were expected to interact with. We see this phenomenon also with implicitly held racial attitudes as shown by McConnell and Leibold et al. (2001). These implicit attitudes affected how long they interacted for, how much participants smiled, how many speech errors they made and how many social comments were made. All automatic behavioral responses that measuring explicit attitudes could not predict.

=== Types of behavior affected by implicit attitudes ===
Implicit attitudes aren't always better at predicting behavior than explicit measurements, they both play a systematic role in predicting behavior. Implicit attitudes are typically better than explicit attitudes at predicting behavior that is automatic and spontaneous. In line with Dual process theories such as Fazio's MODE model, automatic attitudes determine spontaneous actions, whereas deliberative actions reflect a contribution of multiple processes, including more controlled processes (e.g., a person's motivation to overcome prejudiced responses). As demonstrated by Dasgupta an Rivera et al. (2006), individuals who endorsed traditional beliefs about gender and sexuality were friendlier towards gay confederates verbally but showed negative non-verbal behavior, this suggested that this individuals were consciously over-correcting their behavior but their prejudice leaked out through automatic responses like blinking and eye contact.

=== Effects of motivation ===
Although, research has shown that motivation and an opportunity to react carefully can affect how much implicit attitudes influence behavioral response. When individuals are highly motivated to control their responses and processing abilities are not lacking or preoccupied, behavioral responses tend to reflect intentional processes. In 2003, Towles-Schwen and Fazio measured anticipated willingness and discomfort of participants to interact with a black person. Individuals who were motivated to avoid interracial conflicts and where not concerned about seeming biased expressed their discomfort; whereas individuals who were concerned about not appearing biased reported less anticipated discomfort, in an attempt to hide their prejudice. Motivation to control our responses can minimize the influence of implicit attitudes on behavioral responses as shown by that example.

== Measurement ==
There is an assortment of different experimental tests that assess for the presence of implicit attitudes, including the implicit association test, evaluative and semantic priming tasks, the Extrinsic Affective Simon Task, Go/No-Go Association Task, and the Affect Misattribution Procedure. Though these tests vary in administration, and content, the basis of each is to "allow investigators to capture attitudes that individuals are unwilling to report." Unwillingness and lack of ability are intertwined considering most individuals are unaware that these attitudes even exist. The following are brief descriptions about these measurements, which are most commonly used to assess implicit attitudes, and the empirical evidence that supports them.

=== Implicit Association Test ===
The Implicit Association Test is a latency-based measure of the relative associations between two concepts. In a series of tasks, participants sort words or images representing a target concept such as race (white/black) and stimuli with known positive/negative valence into two categories (usually indicated by right or left location on a computer screen). Each category of concept words or images is paired with both positive and negative stimuli. The faster the categorization occurs, the stronger the association is between words and/or images that are grouped together (ex. faster categorization of dogs when paired with positive rather than negative words), which would indicate an implicit attitude towards that object. A full demonstration of the IAT procedure can be found at the Project Implicit link and the IAT Inquisit link below.

Research using the IAT measure of implicit attitudes has demonstrated consistent experimental and population-based attitudes with respect to concepts such as gender, race, and age. An analysis from the Project Implicit database found that science-gender stereotypes are predictive of differences in gender related math and science performance across countries in an international sample. Research has also successfully used the IAT in consumer research. Implicit attitude also directly drives the use of information systems and serves as a basis upon which use habit is formed.

Though the IAT seems powerful in assessing implicit attitudes, the model received several critiques, concerning for its predictive validity, reliability and susceptibility to external factors. First, the IAT's ability to predict individual behavior has been questioned. Some studies suggest that its predictive power regarding discriminatory actions is limited, indicating that high implicit bias scores do not consistently translate to biased behaviors. Second, the test-retest reliability of the IAT has been reported as moderate, with scores varying upon repeated administrations. This variability raises concerns about the consistency of the measure over time. Finally, IAT results can be influenced by factors such as the test's order of tasks, the familiarity of stimuli to participants, and individual differences in cognitive processing speeds. These variables may confound the interpretation of implicit bias levels.

To address contributors of IAT's messy effects, researchers have developed the QUAD model. The model consist of 4 aspects, namely automatic activation of associations, ability to determine a correct response, success of overcoming activated associations and guessing. Automatic activation of associations of a concept, for example, can be associating certain racial groups with specific attributes. High AC (association activation) values indicate strong automatic associations, which can lead to faster and more accurate responses when the associations align with task requirements. Variability in AC among individuals contributes to differences in IAT performance, as those with stronger automatic associations may exhibit more pronounced biases. The ability to determine a correct response means the ability to accurately identify or process a stimuli, and is independent of automatic associations. Participants learn how to answer in a way to convey socially desirable attitudes and hide undesirable ones. A higher detection value suggests a greater capacity to identify and respond correctly, thereby reducing errors. Variations in detection abilities can introduce inconsistencies in IAT outcomes, as individuals with lower detection capabilities may struggle to respond accurately, irrespective of their implicit biases. Success of overcoming activated associations measures the extent to which individuals can suppress or override automatically activated associations that are incongruent with task demands, suggesting that the regulation or suppression of automatic associations that may lead to biased responses. Individuals with high cognitive control can override activated automatic biases, leading to different IAT scores on individuals with the same implicit bias. Guessing refers to random responses due to task uncertainty or when individuals get fatigued after many trials of IAT. Elevated G (guess) values suggest a higher probability of guessing, which can introduce noise into the data and decrease the reliability of IAT measurements. Variability in guessing behavior among participants contributes to the overall "messiness" of IAT results, as increased guessing can obscure the true strength of implicit associations. The QUAD model enhances our understanding of the complexities behind IAT performance. It is crucial to recognize the contributions of these four distinct processes to interpret IAT results accurately and develop interventions aimed at modifying implicit biases.

=== Evaluative priming task ===
Research using the evaluative priming task has been frequently used in research on eating and attitudes towards food. In clinical studies, the procedure was used to study attitudes of those diagnosed with eating disorders such as anorexia nervosa. Along with many of the other methods presented here, researchers have used the procedure to measure the effects of stereotypes, including measurement of the effectiveness of stereotype reduction treatments.

=== Semantic priming task ===
In the semantic priming task paradigm described by Wittenbrink et al. (1997), participants are shown a word prime at intervals which are too brief for reported awareness (see subliminal stimuli). The word prime consists of two groups of words representing the concept in question (such as black sounding names or white sounding names). Participants were then asked to complete a lexical decision task (LDT) to identify if target stimuli are words or a non-words. The target stimuli consist of words with known positive or negative valence. When words with positive valence are categorized more quickly in the presence of one group of word primes (such as black sounding names), this indicates positive attitudes towards the group.

=== Extrinsic Affective Simon Task (EAST) ===
In the Extrinsic Affective Simon Task (EAST), participants categorized stimuli which consisted of words that either had positive or negative valence that were presented in either the color white or two different colors. When the words are presented in white, participants categorize based words on their perceived positive or negative valence. When the words are presented in color, participants are asked to categorize based on color alone and ignore word meaning. When colored words are presented, categorization accuracy and speed are facilitated when, for words which the respondent has a positive implicit attitude, the response was the same as was expected for white words with obvious positive valence. A full demonstration of the EAST procedure can be found in the external links below.

The EAST has been used in research of attitudes of those who have specific phobias and/or anxiety. Additionally, the test has been recently used to measure implicit attitudes towards alcohol in populations who have substance abuse problems; and the test has been cited as having relatively high predictive value for problem substance use.

=== Go/No-go Association Task (GNAT) ===
In practice, the GNAT appears similar to the Implicit Association Test in that participants are asked to categorize targets representing either a concept (such as race; ex. white or black names) or words which have obvious positive or negative valence. Participants are asked to respond ('go') or decline to respond ('no-go') during a short interval after each of the stimuli are presented. In test trials, participants are asked to respond to one of the concepts (white or black) and words with either positive or negative valence; these are then switched so that the concept is then paired with the opposite valence category. When paired with words with positive valence, faster and more accurate responding indicates greater association, and therefore positive attitude towards the target concept (either white or black race). A full demonstration of the GNAT procedure can be found in the external links below.

Like the EAST, the GNAT has been used in populations who have been diagnosed with acute phobias to measure fear associations in addition to research on stereotypes and discrimination.

=== Affect Misattribution Procedure (AMP) ===
The Affect Misattribution Procedure relies on participant ratings of neutral stimuli as an indirect measure of implicit attitudes rather than latency or accuracy measures. In the procedure, participants are first presented with a stimulus (usually an image or word), for either a brief visible period or subliminally, which is suspected to elicit a positive or negative attitude. Directly afterwards, participants are presented with a neutral stimulus (most often a Chinese pictograph) which they are asked to rate as either more or less, in this case visually, pleasing than an average stimulus. During these trials, the positive or negative affect in response to the priming image is misattributed or 'projected' onto the neutral stimulus such that it is rated as more or less pleasing than would be expected from solitary presentation. Neutral stimuli which are rated as more visually pleasing indicate that the preceding concept presented in the prime stimuli are associated with positive valence. A full demonstration of the AMP procedure can be found in the external links below.

The AMP has been used to study attitudes towards political candidates and has proven useful in predicting voting behavior. Also, the procedure is frequently used in the study of substance use; for example, attitudes towards cigarettes among smokers and non-smokers and attitudes towards alcohol among heavy drinkers. It has also been used to measure implicit bias against minority groups.

=== Implicit Relational Assessment Procedure (IRAP) ===
IRAP is a computer-based measure that requires participants to quickly respond to relational pairs of stimuli, allowing researchers to infer implicit beliefs based on reaction times. The IRAP has applications in various contexts, including clinical psychology and social cognition research.

In clinical settings, the IRAP has been used to explore implicit beliefs and attitudes associated with various psychological conditions. For example, it has been used to assess implicit self-esteem in individuals with depression, providing insights that aligns with traditional explicit measures. Additionally, the IRAP has been used to investigate implicit biases related to anxiety disorders, phobia, and other mental health issues, informing therapeutic interventions and providing a more comprehensive picture of these conditions.

Within social cognition research, the IRAP is a valuable tool for examining implicit attitudes toward social groups, stereotypes, and cultural norms. It can capture the relational nature of implicit beliefs, which allows researchers to explore complex social phenomena, such as prejudice, discrimination, and identity formation. By measuring the strength and direction of implicit associations, the IRAP reflects how societal influences shape individual attitudes and behaviors.

To diversify IRAP's applicability on different research domains, several adaptations, such as Natural Language IRAP, Training IRAP and Change Agenda IRAP. Natural Language IRAP uses everyday language stimuli to increase ecological validity, making the assessment more reflective of real-world interactions. Training IRAP evaluates the effects of interventions aimed at modifying implicit attitudes, this version assesses changes in relational responses following targeted training programs. Change Agenda IRAP focuses on measuring shifts in implicit beliefs over time, particularly in response to therapeutic or educational interventions.

While the IRAP has shown to be effective in various research contexts, considerations regarding its reliability and validity have been noted. Studies have emphasized the need for consistent administration protocols and careful interpretation of results to ensure the measure's effectiveness. Ongoing research continues to modify the IRAP's methodology, aiming to enhance its psychometric usage and establish standardized guidelines for its use.

=== Bona Fide Pipeline ===
The Bona Fide Pipeline is developed by Russell H. Fazio, which is an indirect measure of implicit attitudes. This method assesses automatic evaluations by examining the facilitation effect when participants categorize target stimuli after a prime. For example, individuals may categorize negative words more quickly after being primed with images of certain social groups, serving as an indicator of implicit attitudes of social categorization.

Fazio's seminal work introduced this methodology as an unobtrusive measure of racial attitudes, emphasizing the automatic activation of evaluations upon exposure to racial stimuli. The study involves presenting participants with primes, such as faces of different racial groups, followed by target adjectives with positive or negative valences. The speed and accuracy of their responses serve as indicators of their implicit attitudes. This approach aims to mitigate social desirability biases often associated with explicit self-report measures.

=== Single-Category Implicit Association Test (SC-IAT) ===
The SC-IAT is a variation of the traditional IAT. Unlike the IAT, which compares two contrasting categories, the SC-IAT focuses on a single target category paired with evaluative attributes. This extension is especially useful for assessing implicit attitudes toward a single concept without direct comparison.

The SC-IAT presents participants with stimuli related to the target category along with positive and negative evaluative words. Participants are required to rapidly categorize these stimuli, and the response times are used to infer the strength and valence of their implicit attitudes toward the target category. Faster response times when pairing the target category with positive attributes, as opposed to negative ones, suggest a more favorable implicit attitude toward the target, and vice versa.

This methodology has been applied across various domains to explore implicit biases and preferences. For example, researchers have used the SC-IAT to investigate attitudes toward different soda brands, self-esteem levels, and racial attitudes. The flexibility of the SC-IAT allows for its application in diverse fields, including consumer behavior, health psychology, and social cognition research.

== Comparison with explicit attitudes ==
=== Explicit Attitudes ===
An explicit attitude is an evaluation derived from conscious deliberate formation, and typically contain positive or negative valence toward an attitude object. They are generally measured through assessments such as self-report questionnaires, surveys, and observation. In comparison to implicit attitudes, research has suggested that changes to explicit ones occur rapidly and are easier to uphold, especially after exposure to new counterattitudinal information. This contrasting change is due to its fast-learning mechanism that logically evaluates new information.

=== Early focus on explicit attitudes ===
Much of the literature within the field of social psychology has focused on explicit constructions of the attitude construct. Until more recently, examination of attitudes beyond reported awareness has lagged far behind that of explicit attitudes. This point is driven home in a review of research in the mid-1990s which found that among attitudinal research published in 1989, approximately only 1 in 9 experimental paradigms utilized an indirect measure of attitude (necessary for determining contributions of implicit attitudes) while all of the reviewed studies employed direct measures such as self report of attitudes which were explicitly aware to participants.

=== New ideas about implicit versus explicit attitudes ===
Newer research has called into question the distinction between implicit and explicit attitudes. Fazio & Olson ask whether a person who is being primed to detect implicit attitudes is necessarily blind to their implicit beliefs. In their paper they bring up the question; just because a person is primed on an unconscious level and may indeed be answering on an unconscious level, does that not mean that they could still be aware of their attitudes nonetheless. "A second troublesome aspect of the implicit-explicit distinction is that it implies preexisting dual attitudes". They go on to say there is not a known test capable of measuring explicit attitudes solely without the influence of implicit attitudes as well. However, they do go on to say that context can have a significant effect on this particular line of research. People's explicitly stated and implicitly tested attitudes are more likely to be in sync for trivial matters such as preference in a presidential election than for highly charged issues such as predispositions towards a certain race. They exert that "The more sensitive the domain, the greater the likelihood that motivational factors will be evoked and exert some influence on overt responses to an explicit measure". In other words, it is easier to compare explicit and implicit attitudes on safe subjects than subjects where people are likely to mask their beliefs.

A prominent dual process theory specifying the relation between implicit and explicit attitudes is Gawronski and Bodenhausen's associative-propositional evaluation (APE) model. A central assumption of the APE model is that implicit and explicit evaluations are the product of two functionally distinct mental processes. Whereas implicit evaluations are assumed to be the outcome of associative processes, explicit evaluations are assumed to be the outcome of propositional processes. Associative processes are conceptualized as the activation of associations on the basis of feature similarity and spatio-temporal contiguity during learning. Propositional processes are defined as the validation of activated information on the basis of cognitive consistency. A central assumption of the APE model is that people tend to rely on their implicit evaluations when making explicit evaluative judgments to the extent that the implicit evaluative response is consistent with other momentarily considered propositional information. However, people may reject implicit evaluations for making explicit evaluative judgments when the implicit evaluative response is inconsistent with other momentarily considered propositional information. In addition to explaining the relation between implicit and explicit evaluations, the APE model accounts for diverging patterns of attitude change, including:

1. changes in implicit but not explicit evaluations
2. changes in explicit but not implicit evaluations
3. corresponding changes in implicit and explicit evaluations
4. opposite changes in implicit and explicit evaluations.

=== Interaction of implicit and explicit attitude ===
The following are some examples of how implicit attitude and explicit attitude are moderated by each other and how they interact with each other.

==== Opposing Implicit and Explicit Attitudes ====
Research on the relationship between implicit and explicit attitudes suggest that individuals can hold opposing attitudes simultaneously. Previous research has demonstrated this by simultaneously measuring participants' implicit attitudes (primarily using the IAT) and explicit attitudes (mostly using self report questionnaires). Analysis of both measures have revealed that individuals concurrently have negative implicit attitudes and positive explicit attitudes about the same attitude object. Similar research findings have been relatively consistent across global studies.

==== Possible Mechanisms Behind Opposing Implicit and Explicit Attitudes ====
===== Self presentation =====
Individuals will alter a response when questioned for personal or social purposes. This typically happens in situations where individuals are not willing to report or express their "affective response toward an object" because they don't want others to know how they feel about something (they don't consciously accept or endorse their evaluation). Since implicit measures are not as vulnerable to control as explicit measures are, the correlation between implicit and explicit attitudes should decrease as self presentation concerns increase. For example, in 2005 Nosek found that there was more overlap in explicit and implicit measures when people rated Pepsi vs. Coca-Cola (low self presentation concern). However, when they rated thin vs. fat people (high self presentation concern), the correlation (or overlap) of implicit and explicit measure decreased.

===== Information Processing =====
Prior research has touched upon different cognitive systems behind implicit and explicit attitude formation and change, resulting in implicit-explicit attitude discrepancy. As elicited, explicit attitudes are formed through a fast-learning mechanism that relies on conscious available information, whereas implicit attitudes are the result of subliminally presented stimuli which undergo associative processes. As per these bases, explicit attitudes can be changed quite quickly, and implicit attitudes are more complex and time-consuming to change. Thus, through different learning systems, implicit and explicit attitudes content can be contrasted.

===== Structural Fit =====
Implicit-explicit attitude discrepancies have also been reported as a result of improper testing when measuring the two types of attitudes of the same object. The structural-fit hypothesis posits that due to the different structures and formats of direct and indirect measures, implicit and explicit attitudes will not be significantly correlated. However, when the measures include similar formats and features, that is when they will be more congruent. Researchers have argued that indirect measures (such as the IAT) and direct measures (self-reports) result in contrasting implicit and explicit attitudes because they ask about attitudes in different ways. In accordance with the structural-fit hypothesis, when the two types of measures ask about attitudes in similar ways, the association between the two attitudes will be more consistent. Therefore, suggestions such as changing measures so that it focuses on attitudes towards certain aspects of an object, rather than the general object itself, may be beneficial when investigating the difference. Much of this explanation yearns for more research, as it is minimal. However, there has been supporting evidence that when measures are adjusted to match structure, implicit and explicit attitudes are more correlated.

==== Attitude strength ====
The strength of an attitude has an influence on explicit attitudes the stronger an implicit attitude the more likely it is that it will show up in an explicit attitude. Strong attitudes are stable and not easily changed due to persuasion and can therefore help predict behaviors. The more an individual expresses or acts on an attitude the stronger the attitude becomes and the more automated the attitude becomes. Attitude strength should increase the correspondence between implicit and explicit attitudes. Conscious thinking about the attitude should create more of an overlap between both implicit and explicit attitude.

== See also ==
- Alief (mental state)
- Attitude (psychology)
- Emotional baggage
- Halo Effect
- Implicit assumption
- Implicit cognition
- Implicit self-esteem
- Implicit stereotypes
- Implicit-association test
- Lexical decision task
- List of cognitive biases
- Mere-exposure effect
- Priming (psychology)
- Valence (psychology)
