= Tacit assumption =

Assumption that underlies a logical argument

A tacit assumption or implicit assumption is an assumption that underlies a logical argument, course of action, decision, or judgment that is not explicitly voiced nor necessarily understood by the decision maker or judge. These assumptions may be made based on personal life experiences, and are not consciously apparent in the decision making environment. These assumptions can be the source of apparent paradoxes, misunderstandings and resistance to change in human organizational behavior.

Tacit assumptions in science often include the elegance of natural laws, and the applicability of mathematics.

== See also ==
- Assumption-based planning
- Consensus reality
- Hidden curriculum
- Implicit attitude
- Implicit cognition
- Implicit leadership theory
- Implicit memory
- Implied consent
- Leading question
- Premise
- Presupposition
- Shattered assumptions theory
- Subreption
- Tacit knowledge
- Unsaid
- Unspoken rule
