= Implicit cognition =

Cognitive processes outside conscious awareness or control

Implicit cognition refers to cognitive processes that occur outside conscious awareness or conscious control. This includes domains such as learning, perception, or memory which may influence a person's behavior without their conscious awareness of those influences.

== Overview ==
Implicit cognition is everything one does and learns unconsciously or without any awareness that one is doing it. An example of implicit cognition could be when a person first learns to ride a bike: at first they are aware that they are learning the required skills. After having stopped for many years, when the person starts to ride the bike again they do not have to relearn the motor skills required, as their implicit knowledge of the motor skills takes over and they can just start riding the bike as if they had never stopped. In other words, they do not have to think about the actions that they are performing in order to ride the bike. It can be seen from this example that implicit cognition is involved with many of the different mental activities and everyday situations in people's daily lives. There are many processes in which implicit memory works, which include learning, our social cognition, and our problem-solving skills.

== History ==
Implicit cognition was first discovered in the year of 1649 by Descartes in his Passions of the Soul. He said in one of his writings that he saw that unpleasant childhood experiences remain imprinted in a child's brain until its death without any conscious memory of it remaining. Even though this idea was never accepted by any of his peers, in 1704 Gottfried Wilhelm Leibniz in his New Essays Concerning Human Understanding stressed the importance of unconscious perceptions which he said were the ideas that we are not consciously aware of yet still influence people's behavior. He claimed that people have residual effects of prior impressions without any remembrance of them. In 1802 French philosopher Maine de Biran in his The Influence of Habit on the Faculty of Thinking was the first person after Leibniz to systematically discuss implicit memory stating that after enough repetition, a habit can become automatic or completed without any conscious awareness. In 1870 Ewald Hering said that it was essential to consider unconscious memory, which is involved in the involuntary recall, and the development of automatic and unconscious habitual actions.

== Assessment ==
One of the most popular metrics utilizing implicit cognition is the implicit-association test. The IAT is designed to detect unconscious associations between concepts, making it a useful assessment in the field of social psychology. A controversial application of the IAT is the assessment of implicit stereotypes, such as associations between particular racial categories and stereotypes about those groups. There is significant academic and popular debate regarding its validity, reliability, and usefulness in assessing implicit bias.

== Implicit learning ==
Implicit learning starts in our early childhood, this means that people are not able to learn the proper grammar and rules to speaking a language until the age of seven, yet children can learn to talk by the age of four. One of the ways that this is possible is through implicit learning and association. Children learn their first language from what they hear when they are listening to adults and through their own talking activities. This goes to show that the way children learn language involves implicit learning.

=== Studies on implicit learning ===
A study was conducted with amnesiac patients in an attempt to demonstrate that amnesiac patients that were unable to learn a list of words or pictures when their performance was tested were able to complete or put together fragmented words and incomplete pictures. This was found to be true as the patients were able to perform better when asked to complete words or pictures. A possible explanation for this could be that implicit memory should be less susceptible to damage that may happen to the brain than explicit memory. There was a case where a 54-year-old man that had bitemporal damage worse on the right side had a hard time remembering things from his own life as well as famous events, names and even; yet he was able to perform within the normal limits with a word completion task involving famous names and with judgments of famous faces. This is a prime example that implicit memory can be less vulnerable to brain damage.

A famous study investigated the Identification blindsight effect with individuals who had suffered damage to one-half of the visual cortex and was blind in the opposite half of the visual field. It was discovered that when objects or pictures were shown to these blind areas, the participants said that they saw no object or picture, but a certain number were able to identify the stimulus as either a cross or circle when asked to guess at a considerably higher rate than would have been expected by chance. The reason that this happened is that the information was able to be processed through the first three stages of selection, organization, and interpretation or comprehension of the perceptual cycle but failed at only the last stage of retention and memory where the identified image is entered into their awareness. Thus stimuli can enter implicit memory even when people are unable to consciously perceive them.

== Implicit social relations ==
Implicit cognition also plays a role in social cognition. People tend to see objects and individuals as more encouraging or acceptable the more often that people are exposed to them. An example includes the False-fame Effect. Graf and Masson (1993) conducted a study where they showed participants a list with both famous and non-famous names. When it was shown around people were able to recall the famous names more than the non-famous names initially, but after about a 24-hour delay participants began to associate the non-famous names with famous people. This supports implicit cognition because the participants began to unconsciously associate the non-famous names with famous people.

Although the process is unconscious, implicit cognition influences how people view each other as well as their interactions with one another. People tend to view those who look alike as belonging together or to similar groups and associate them with the social groups that existed in their high school years. These groups represented different relations between the students and were made up of students who were perceived as having similarities among each other. A study was conducted to see the amount of distance that participants put between individuals given certain circumstances. The participants were asked to place figures of individuals where they thought the figures should be standing given certain circumstances. It was found that people typically place men and women close to each other, to make little families formed with the figures of a woman, a man, and children. The participants did the same when asked to show friends and/or acquaintances, the two figures were placed relatively close to one another rather than if they were asked to represent strangers. When asked to represent strangers the participants placed the figures far apart. There are two parts to the view of social relations that is liking relations where the ultimate goal is to be together, then there is the disliking relation view which is separation from the person. An example of this could be when someone is walking down a hallway and see someone whom they know and like that person is more likely to wave and say hello to them. On the other hand, say the person they see is someone whom they dislike, their response will be the opposite as they try to either avoid them or get away from them as quickly as possible showing the separation between the two of them. There are two views to the theory of social relation, one of them is that people are out to mainly seek dominance of those around them, while the other view is that people mainly see the relations as either belonging or not belonging or liking and disliking on another. It is seen that males mainly seek dominance against one another as they are competitive and looking to outdo one another. Females on the other hand it is seen that women perceive their social views and values as more of the belonging or liking scale in terms of their closeness to one another. Implicit cognition not only involved how people view each other but also how they view themselves. This means that our own image is constructed from what others see of us rather than our own views. The way that we view ourselves is from what others see us as, or from the times that we compare ourselves to other people. The way that this plays a role in implicit cognition is because of all of these actions people do unconsciously, or they are unaware that they are making this decision. Men do not consciously seek to be dominant over one another as women do not consciously arrange their social views or values in terms of their closeness. These are each thing that people do without their conscious knowledge of these actions, which ties in with implicit cognition.

== Implicit attitudes ==
Implicit attitudes (also called automatic attitudes) are mental evaluations that occur without the awareness of the person.

Although there is a debate about whether these can be measured fully, attitudes have been assessed with the implicit association test (IAT). The test claims to measure people's implicit associations with certain groups or races. But the controversy lies on whether it does predict people's future behaviors. Some claim that the IAT does predict if someone will act differently toward a certain group others believe there is not enough evidence to assure this will happen.

It is not well known how these are developed many believe that they come from past experiences, pleasant experiences or unpleasant ones can influence how a person's attitudes are formed towards a specific thing. This explanation implies that attitudes could be unpleasant if the previous experience was also an unpleasant one, they can also be formed because of early experiences in the early stages of life. Another possible explanation is the fact that implicit attitudes can also stem from affective experiences, there is evidence that the amygdala is involved in affective or emotional reactions to stimuli. A third explanation involves cultural biases, this was shown in a study done by Greenwald, McGhee, and Schwartz (1998) that in-group bias was more prevalent when the in-group was more in tune with their ancestral culture (for example knowing the language).

Evidence suggests that early and affective experiences might affect implicit attitudes and associations more than the other explanations provided.

== Implicit behaviors ==
There are scenarios when we act on something and then think back about handling it in a different situation or manner. That is implicit cognition coming into play, the mind will then go based on ethical and similar situations when interacting with a certain thought. Implicit cognition and its automated thought process allow a person to decide something out of impulse. It is often defined as an involuntary process where tasks are easily absent of consciousness. There are plenty of factors that influence behaviors and thought processes. Such as social learning, stigmas, and two major aspects of implicit and explicit cognition. Implicit on one hand is obtained through social aspects and association, while explicit cognition is gained through propositional attitudes or beliefs of certain thoughts, Implicit cognition can be incorporated with a mixture of attention, goals, self-association, and at times even motivational processes. Researchers have used different methods to test these theories of behavior's correlation with implicit cognition. Using Implicit Association Tests (IAT's) is a method that is significantly used, according to Fazio & Olsen (2003) and Richetin & Richardson (2008). Since published, approximately ten years or so, it has been widely used in influencing research on implicit attitudes. Implicit cognition is a process based on automatic mental interpretations. It's what a person really thinks, yet is not consciously aware of. Behavior is then affected, usually causing negative influences, both theoretical and empirical reasons presume that automatic cognitive processes are contributed to aggressive behaviors.

Impulse behaviors are often created without awareness. Negativity is a characteristic of implicit cognition since it is an automated response. Explicit cognition is rarely used when trying to discover the behavior of one thought process. Researchers again use IAT's to determine one's thoughts and how a person incorporates these automatic processes, findings consider that implicit cognition may direct what behaviors a person may choose when facing extreme stimuli. For example, death can be perceived as positive, negative, or a combination of the two. Depending on the attributes of death, it can include a general perspective or a "me" attribute. Nock et al. (2010) implied that implicit association with death and or suicide initiates a final process when deciding how to cope with these extreme measures. Self-harm is another characteristic associated with implicit cognition. Because although we may think of it, it is controlled subconsciously. IAT's showed that there was a stronger correlation between implicit cognition and death/suicide than self-harm. The idea of pain may influence a person to think twice, while suicide may seem quick, thus the automatic process can show how effective this negative behavior and implicit cognition come hand in hand. Automated processes don't allow a person to thoroughly create a conscious choice, therefore creating a negative influence to behavior. Another negative behavior that can be associated with implicit cognition is depression. Whether a person takes a positive or negative outlook on a certain situation can produce if a person will be associated with depression. It is easier to determine an implicit mindset simply because it is outside of awareness. Implicit processes are considered critical when determining a person's reactions to a certain schema. Implicit cognition is often immediately affective towards a person's reaction. Implicit cognitions also consisted of negative schemas that included hidden cognitive frameworks and activation of stress. Awareness was often misinterpreted and implicit cognition emerged because of these negative schemas. Behaviors merged through implicit cognition involve a variety of addictive behaviors, problematic thinking, depression, aggression, suicide, death, and other negative factors. Certain life situations add to this schema, whether it be stressful situations, sudden, or anything along these lines, aspects of implicit cognition are used and evaluated.

Implicit cognition can also be associated with mental illness and the way thoughts are processed. Automatic stigmas and attitudes may anticipate other cognitive and behavioral tendencies. A person with mental illness may be correlated with a guilt-related, self-associated personality. Because of these associations it may be managed outside one's own control and awareness, showing how implicit cognition is affected. However, a dual process can be assessed within implicit and explicit cognition. An agreement between the two thought processes may be an issue, explicit may not be in contact with implicit, therefore causing more of a problem. Mental illness can include both implicit and explicit attitudes, however, implicit self-concepts gave more negative consequences when dealing with mental illness. Much of implicit problems happened to be associated with alcohol, however, this isn't the goal in order to describe a mental process and implicit cognition. The most widely influenced mental illness in association with implicit cognition would be Schizophrenia. Since a person with this illness has a problem detecting what is real and what is not, implicit memory is often used with these patients. However, since it cannot really be detected if it is emotional, mental, or a combination of both some aspects of this illness is usually exercised uninterrupted, and unconsciously. Since schizophrenia is widely varied and has different characteristics, we cannot quite measure the outcome of implicit cognition.

== Definition ==
Implicit cognition refers to perceptual, memory, comprehension, and performance processes that occur through unconscious awareness. For example, when a patient is discharged after surgery, the effects of the anesthesia can cause abnormal behaviors without any conscious awareness. According to Wiers et al. (2006), some scholars argue implicit cognition is misinterpreted and could be used to improve behaviors while others highlight the dangers of it. Research studies have shown implicit cognition is a strong predictor for several issues like substance abuse, misconduct, and mental disorders. These inherent thoughts are influenced by early adolescent experiences primarily a negative impact from culture. Adolescents who experience a rough childhood early on develop low levels of self-esteem. Therefore, the cognition to act dangerously is an oblivious development. Research for implicit cognition has started to grow especially within mental disorders.

== In mental disorders ==
Schemas are used to interpret the functions involved when individuals would make sense of their surroundings. This cognition happens through an explicit process of recalling an item routinely or an implicit process that is outside conscious awareness control. A recent study suggests individuals who have experienced a difficult upbringing develop schemata of fear as well as anxiety and will react almost immediately when they feel threatened. People who are anxious predominantly focus on any peril-related stimuli since they are hyper-vigilant. For example, an anxious individual who is about to cross the street at the same time a car drives to a stop sign. The anxious person will automatically assume the driver will not stop. This is recognition of threat through a semantic process that instantaneously occurs. Ambiguous cues are viewed as a threat since there is no relevant knowledge to make sense of. People will have a difficult time understanding and will respond negatively. This kind of behavior can explain how implicit cognition may be an influence on pathological anxiety.

The ideas of psychotic patients who have low self-esteem are prone to more serious illnesses. This concept was examined through both implicit and explicit perspectives by measuring the self-esteem of paranoia and depression patients. Previous research suggests that negative implicit cognition is not the symptom of depression and paranoia, but it is an antecedent for the onset. Current research proposes that high implicit self-esteem is linked to less paranoia. It is imperative for patients who have low self-esteem to become more overt about these situations. Another study found a substantial association between adverse self-questioning in implicit cognition and depression. People who do not think highly of themselves are more likely to be depressed because of this involuntary implicit learning.

Implicit cognition is another influential predictor for bipolar disorder and unipolar disorder. The research proposes patients with bipolar disorder show more common implicit and depressive self-referencing than unipolar patients. Implicit cognition plays a strong role in patients with the both bipolar and unipolar disorder. These patients have dysfunctional self-schemata, which is viewed as a vulnerability for potential illnesses. Patients who have this vulnerability usually do not seek mental assistance which can later become more problematic to treat. Bipolar disorder patients with low implicit self-esteem are more defensive. This is an unconscious reaction to be manic protective when they feel threatened in any way. Since the growing research of implicit cognition is associated with abnormalities, researchers attempted to find a connection between implicit neuroticism and schizophrenia. Indeed, there was a correlation; participants with schizophrenia were high in implicit neuroticism and low in implicit extraversion when compared to people who were mentally healthy. Participants were given questionnaires that ask personality questions such as "I enjoy being the center of attention". Implicit cognition constitutes low levels of extraversion because these participants are known to avoid any coping. Schizophrenia patients and healthy individuals differ in associative representation pertaining to themselves in neuroticism features. People who are schizophrenic develop implicit learning, meaning they have an error-free learning style so they never take feedback from anyone else.

Research on suicide can be a difficult process because suicidal patients are commonly covert about their intentions to avoid hospitalization. An implicit cognition associated with self-task was applied in one experiment to unveil any suspicious behavior of people who might attempt suicide. This study found patients who were released from mental hospitals showed significant implicit association to attempt suicide. The Implicit Association Task would predict whether a patient was likely to attempt suicide depending on their response. An individual's implicit cognition may lead to behavior to best cope with stress. This behavior may be suicide, substance abuse, or even violence. However, implicit association with death will show those most at risk for attempting suicide because this individual is looking for the best solution for ending their stress.

== See also ==
- Alief (mental state)
- Consciousness
- Implicit assumption
- Implicit attitude
- Implicit memory
- Implicit stereotypes
- Relational frame theory
- Response priming
- Subliminal stimuli
