= Mahzarin Banaji =

Indian social psychologist (born 1956)

Mahzarin Rustum Banaji
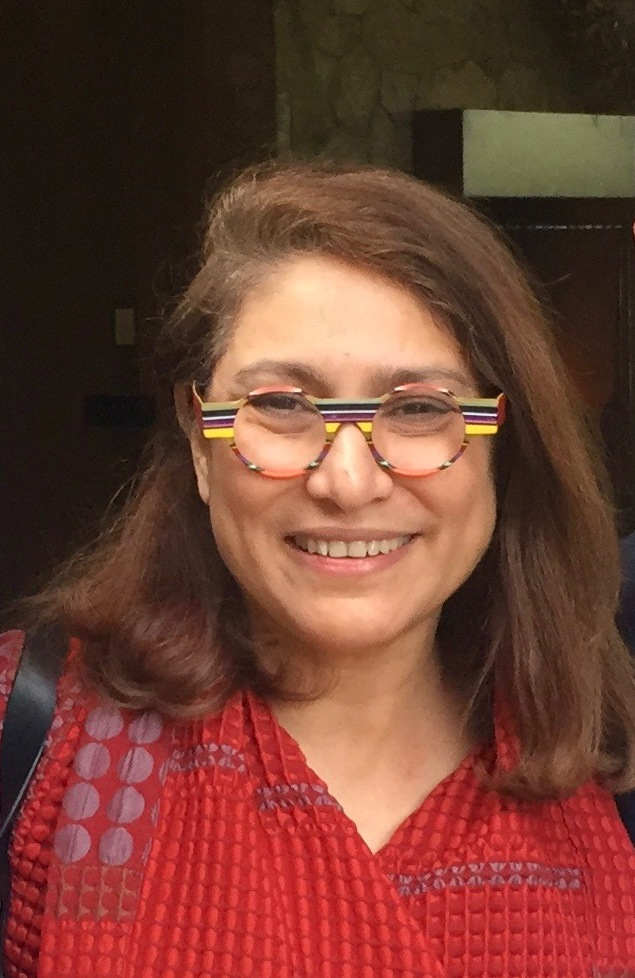
- Banaji in 2015
- Born: 1956 (age 69–70); Secunderabad, Telangana, India
- Education: Nizam College, Osmania University, Ohio State University
- Known for: Implicit Association Test
- Awards: James McKeen Cattell Fellow Award (2022)
- Scientific career
- Fields: Social psychology
- Workplaces: Yale University (1986–2001), Harvard University

Mahzarin Rustum Banaji FBA (born 1956) is an American psychologist of Indian origin at Harvard University, known for her work popularizing the concept of implicit bias in regard to race, gender, sexual orientation, and other factors.

== Education and career ==
She was born and raised in Secunderabad to a Parsi family, where she attended St. Ann's High School. Her BA degree is from Nizam College, and her MA degree in psychology from Osmania University in Hyderabad. In 1986, Banaji received a PhD from The Ohio State University and was an NIH postdoctoral fellow at University of Washington.

From 1986 to 2001, she taught at Yale University, where she was Reuben Post Halleck Professor of Psychology. In 2001, she moved to Harvard University as Richard Clarke Cabot Professor of Social Ethics in the department of psychology. She also served as the first Carol K. Pforzheimer Professor at the Radcliffe Institute for Advanced Study from 2002 to 2008. In 2005, Banaji was elected fellow of the Society of Experimental Psychologists. She was elected a Fellow of the American Academy of Arts and Sciences in 2008. In 2009, she was named Herbert A. Simon Fellow of the American Academy of Political and Social Science. She was elected as a Corresponding Fellow of the British Academy in 2015. In 2016, the Association for Psychological Science named Banaji one of its William James Fellows, an award given to outstanding contributors to scientific psychology. She was elected to the National Academy of Sciences in 2018.

== Current affiliations ==
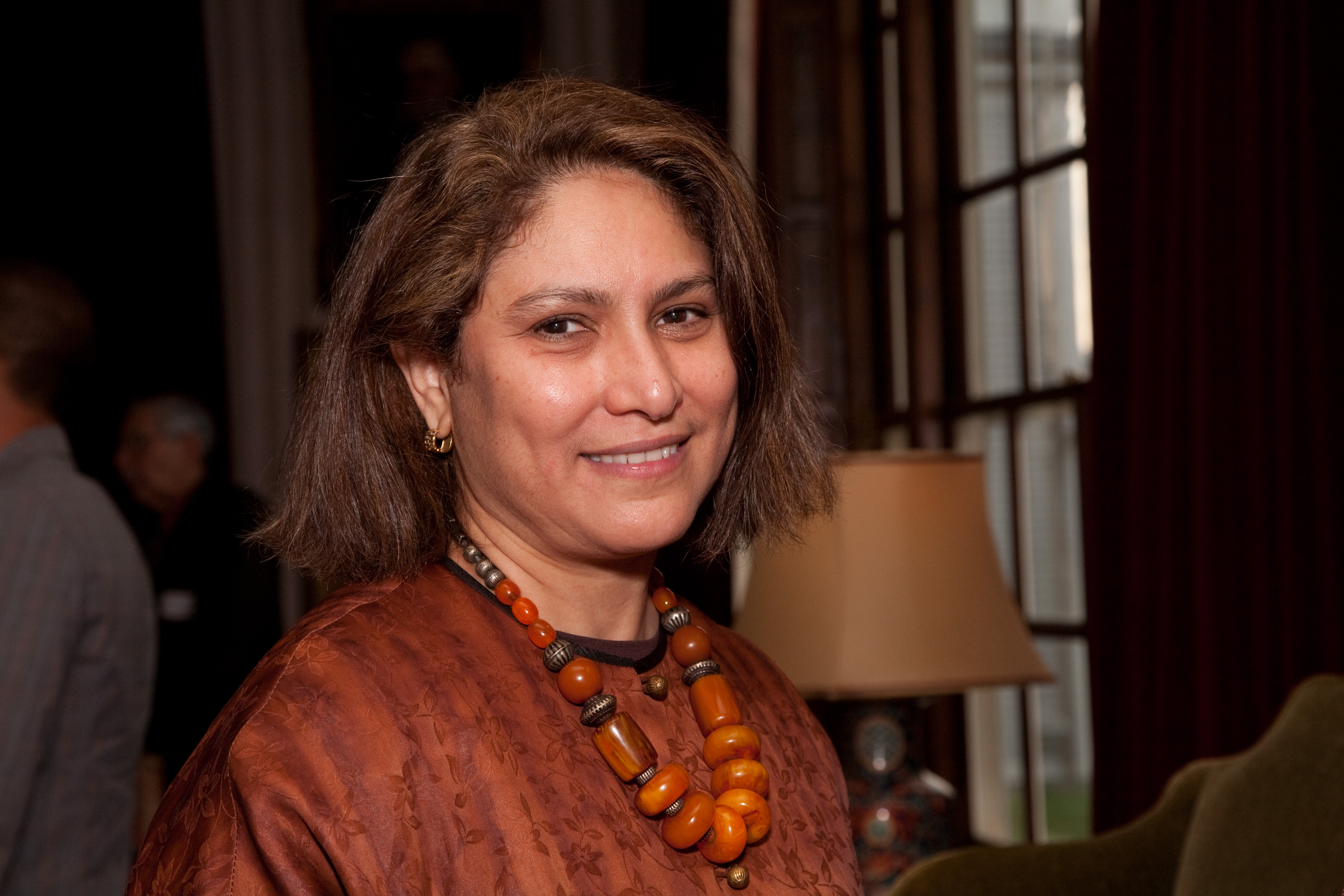
Mahzarin Banaji at the Edmond J. Safra Center for Ethics in 2010

Banaji is a Fellow of the American Association for the Advancement of Science, the American Psychological Association (Divisions 1, 3, 8 and 9), and the Association for Psychological Science. She served as Secretary of the APS, on the Board of Scientific Affairs of the APA, and on the Executive Committee of the Society of Experimental Social Psychology. Banaji was President of the Association for Psychological Science in 2010–2011. She is an external professor at the Santa Fe Institute, where she contributes to programs on behavior and decision-making.

Banaji has served as associate editor of Psychological Review and the Journal of Experimental Social Psychology and co-edited Essays in Social Psychology for Psychology Press. She serves on an advisory board of the Oxford University Press on social cognition and social neuroscience. She has served or serves on the editorial board of several journals, among them Psychological Science, Psychological Review, Perspectives on Psychological Science, Behavioral and Brain Sciences, Social Cognition, Journal of Personality and Social Psychology, and Social Cognitive and Affective Neuroscience. Her research has been funded by the National Science Foundation, the National Institutes of Health, and the Third Millennium Foundation, among other organizations.

Banaji was director of undergraduate studies at Yale and has served as head tutor and chair of the department of psychology at Harvard.

== Honors and awards ==
Most recently, she received U.S. Congress' Golden Goose Award, was inducted as a member to the National Academy of Sciences, named a Distinguished Member of Psi Chi, an International Honor Society in Psychology, received the Scientific Impact Award from the Society of Experimental Social Psychology, Distinguished Cognitive Scientist Award from the University of California, Distinguished Theoretical and Empirical Contributions to Basic Research in Psychology Award from the American Psychological Association, the Campbell Award for Distinguished Scholarly Achievement and Ongoing Sustained Excellence in Research in Social Psychology from the Society of Personality and Social Psychology, Distinguished Alumnus Award, from The Ohio State University, William James Fellow Award for a Lifetime of Significant Intellectual Contributions to the Basic Science of Psychology from the Association for Psychological Science, Kurt Lewin Award for Outstanding Contributions to Psychological Research and Social Action from the Society for the Psychological Study of Social Issues, and Corresponding Fellow from the British Academy for the Humanities and Social Sciences.

Among her other awards, she has received Yale's Lex Hixon Prize for Teaching Excellence, a James McKeen Cattell Fund Award, the Morton Deutsch Award for Social Justice, and fellowships from the Guggenheim Foundation, the Rockefeller Foundation, and the Radcliffe Institute for Advanced Study. In 1999, her work with R. Bhaskar received the Gordon Allport Prize for Intergroup Relations. Her career contributions have been recognized by a Presidential Citation from the American Psychological Association in 2007, the Diener Award for Outstanding Contributions to Social Psychology in 2008, and the APA Award for Distinguished Scientific Contributions to Psychology from the American Psychological Association in 2017. In addition, she was elected the American Academy of Political and Social Science's Herbert Simon Fellow in 2009. She was also awarded an honorary doctorate degree by Carnegie Mellon University in 2017. Banaji was honored alongside Anthony Greenwald and Brian Nosek by the American Association for the Advancement of Science with a 2018 Golden Goose Award for their work on implicit bias. In 2020 she was elected to the American Philosophical Society. For 2024 she was awarded the BBVA Foundation Frontiers of Knowledge Award in the category "Social Sciences".

== Major publications ==
- Banaji, Mahzarin R. & Crowder, Robert G (September 1989), "The bankruptcy of everyday memory research" (PDF), American Psychologist, 44 (9): 1185–1193, doi:10.1037/0003-066X.44.9.1185 A seminal article on two primary research methods (experimental and ecological) and issues associated with each.
- Banaji, M.R. & Crowder, R.G (1991), "Some everyday thoughts on ecologically valid methods" (PDF), American Psychologist, 46 (1): 78–79, doi:10.1037/0003-066X.46.1.78. A response to some commentary on their article, and their attempt to clarify some of their points.
- Greenwald, A. G. & Banaji, M. R. (1995). Implicit social cognition: Attitudes, self-esteem, and stereotypes. Psychological Review, 102, 4-27.
- Greenwald, A. G., Banaji, M. R., Rudman, L., Farnham, S., Nosek, B. A., & Mellott, D. (2002). A unified theory of implicit attitudes, stereotypes, self-esteem, and self-concept. Psychological Review, 109, 3-25.
- Green, A. R., Carney, D. R., Pallin, D. J., Ngo, L. H., Raymond, K. L., Iezzoni, L., & Banaji, M. R. (2007). Implicit bias among physicians and its prediction of thrombolysis decisions for black and white patients. Journal of General Internal Medicine, 22, 1231–1238.
- Greenwald, A. G. & Banaji, M. R. (2013). Blindspot: Hidden Biases of Good People. Delacorte Press, ISBN 978-0553804645

== See also ==
- Implicit stereotype
- Implicit attitude
