= Anthony Greenwald =

American psychologist

Anthony Galt Greenwald
- Education: Harvard University; Yale University
- Scientific career
- Fields: Psychology
- Workplaces: University of Washington; Ohio State University

Anthony Galt Greenwald is a social psychologist who, since 1986, has been a professor of psychology at the University of Washington.

In 1959, Greenwald received a B.A. from Yale University. In 1961, he received a M.A. from Harvard University, and in 1963, he completed his PhD, also at Harvard. After that, he completed a postdoctoral fellowship that lasted from 1963 to 1965 at the Educational Testing Service.

Greenwald started teaching in 1965 as an assistant professor in the psychology department at Ohio State University, which continued until 1986. During that time, he was an associate editor for the Journal of Personality and Social Psychology, from 1972 to 1976, before becoming the editor in 1977. From 2001 to 2005, Greenwald was the associate editor of Experimental Psychology.

== Awards ==
Greenwald has been recognized with a variety of significant awards, including the Donald T. Campbell Award from the Society for Personality and Social Psychology in 1994, Research Scientist Award from the National Institute of Mental Health from 1998 to 2004, and the Thomas M. Ostrom Award from Person Memory Interest Group in 2001. In 2006, Greenwald received the Distinguished Scientist Award from Society of Experimental Social Psychology and in 2017 the APA Award for Distinguished Scientific Contributions to Psychology from the American Psychological Association. Greenwald was honored alongside Mahzarin Banaji and Brian Nosek by the American Association for the Advancement of Science with a 2018 Golden Goose Award for their work on implicit bias. For 2024 he was awarded the BBVA Foundation Frontiers of Knowledge Award in the category "Social Sciences".

== Research interests ==
Greenwald, Mahzarin Banaji, Brian Nosek, and others, have conducted extensive research on cognition and have collaborated to create the implicit association test (IAT). This test measures the extent to which an individual will associate two individual concepts. Between October 1998 and October 2006, more than 4.5 million IAT tests were completed on the IAT website. This test explores "All sorts of implicit attitudes that we cannot self-report in questionnaires because we are not aware of having them". In an article by Greenwald, Banaji, and Nosek entitled, "Understanding and Using the Implicit Association Test: II. Method Variable and Construction Validity", he mentions that questioning a number of things, including how to maximize the effectiveness of the IAT design, will help the advancement of the test to stretch across various studies and laboratories.

Greenwald has studied and advanced the theory of a central route to persuasion; he and his colleagues agree a third step of elaboration is needed. The concept of elaboration allows the argument to be extended and, for the receiver of the conversation to process information that he or she is being given more effectively. This helps individuals to determine the strength of the contents in the article and gives way to the idea that "strong arguments are persuasive, and weak arguments are not".

One of Greenwald's observations concerns autobiographies. He mentions that, since autobiographies are links to the past, these memories are vital in shaping one's identity, which can motivate individuals to distort the past so that behaviors and events are well received by others (2008, p. 64). In 1980, Greenwald said, "[t]he past is remembered as if it were a drama in which the self was the leading player" (p. 64).

== Book ==
- Greenwald, A. G. and Banaji, M. R., Blindspot: Hidden Biases of Good People, 2013, Delacorte Press, ISBN 978-0553804645

== See also ==
- List of social psychologists

== Sources ==
- Anthony Greenwald, Ph.D. Homepage. (2008, March 28). Selected Articles and Chapters, By Topic. Retrieved April 22, 2008, from faculty.washington.edu.
