= Galen Bodenhausen =

American social psychologist

- Born: 1961 (age 64–65)
- Education: Wright State University (B.S., 1982); University of Illinois at Urbana-Champaign (M.A., 1984; Ph.D., 1987)
- Known for: Stereotypes
- Awards: 2011 Diener Award in Social Psychology from the Foundation for Personality and Social Psychology
- Scientific career
- Fields: Social psychology
- Institutions: Northwestern University
- Thesis: Effects of social stereotypes on evidence processing: The cognitive basis of discrimination in juridic decision making (1987)

Galen Von Bodenhausen (born 1961) is an American social psychologist. He is the Lawyer Taylor Professor of Psychology in the Weinberg College of Arts & Sciences at Northwestern University, where he is also a professor of marketing in the Kellogg School of Management. He is known for his research on gender stereotypes, gender roles, and implicit biases.
