= Alief (mental state) =

Mental state in philosophy and psychology

In philosophy and psychology, an alief is an automatic or habitual belief-like attitude, particularly one that is in tension with a person's explicit beliefs. For example, a person standing on a transparent balcony may believe that they are safe, but alieve that they are in danger. A person watching a sad movie may believe that the characters are completely fictional, but their aliefs may lead them to cry nonetheless. A person who is hesitant to eat fudge that has been formed into the shape of feces, or who exhibits reluctance in drinking from a sterilized bedpan may believe that the substances are safe to eat and drink, but may alieve that they are not.

The term alief was introduced by Tamar Gendler, a professor of philosophy and cognitive science at Yale University, in a pair of influential articles published in 2008. Since the publication of these original articles, the notion of alief has been utilized by Gendler and others—including Paul Bloom and Daniel Dennett—to explain a range of psychological phenomena in addition to those listed above, including the pleasure of stories, the persistence of positive illusions, certain religious beliefs, and certain psychiatric disturbances, such as phobias and obsessive–compulsive disorder.
