= Subliminal messages in popular culture =

While the effectiveness of subliminal messages is often overstated in popular culture, its history in television shows, movies, music and novels has long led to many cultural idioms that persist today.

Governments are often depicted as employing subliminal messages in propaganda:

- The novel Freeze Frame by B. David Warner depicts the election of a corrupt presidential candidate using subliminal advertising to sway the votes in his favor.
- The 1988 movie They Live and the basis story "Eight O'Clock in the Morning" feature subliminal messages created by an alien ruling class as a key plot element.
- The 2001 movie Josie and the Pussycats described a long lasting plot whereby the US government was controlling trends by inserting subliminal messages in popular music. Furthermore, towards the end of the film, a government agent shuts down the operation, saying that subliminal advertising works better in films. The words "Josie and the Pussycats is the best movie ever" are then spoken rapidly in voice-over and displayed quickly on the screen, with the words "Join the Army" in smaller letters below it.
- In the 2005 science fiction movie Serenity, the Alliance uses subliminal messages broadly disseminated in commercials and other video to cause River Tam to go berserk. It only works on River because she was subjected to Alliance training and conditioning.
- Programming the Nation? is a documentary that goes in-depth by interviewing experts on subliminal messaging and manipulation in the media.

Musicians have been associated with alleged incorporating subliminal messages via the use of backmasking, including rock bands Led Zeppelin and Pink Floyd.

Many references deal specifically with the military:

- An episode of The Simpsons involved Bart and his friends joining a boy band, the Party Posse. While watching a video for the Party Posse, Lisa notices the phrase "Yvan Eht Nioj" being repeated continuously by belly-dancers. She plays the video in reverse and finds that it means "Join the Navy". Also, an Uncle Sam "I Want You" poster can be seen in the video frame by frame. The joke was that the United States sends subliminal messages in order to recruit people. In addition, the art of "superliminal messages" was demonstrated to Lisa; a Navy representative leans out a window, sees Lenny Leonard and Carl Carlson, and shouts "Hey you! Join the Navy!"
- In JoJo's Bizarre Adventure: Stone Ocean, a character called Weather Report has an automatic stand called "Heavy Weather". Heavy Weather manipulates the ozone layer to create rainbows that send visual subliminal messages telling people that they are snails. The ability is so effective that people actually start turning into snails. They become susceptible to the weaknesses of snails like salt, boat backed ground beetles, and others.
- In an episode of Malcolm in the Middle titled "Reese joins the Army (2)", one of the drill sergeants comments about the other's restored confidence in the Army ("I guess the subliminal advertising's working after all"). His fellow drill sergeant then matter-of-factly states "the Army doesn't use subliminal ads" and then the pair slowly turn and look at each other. This is not too different from the joke in The Simpsons episode mentioned above, this episode was a joking reference to the low military recruiting numbers in 2004 suggesting that the US military uses such things as a tactic of desperation.
- In a 1995 episode of Babylon 5, during a scene which represents a PSA for the Psi Corps, the words "Trust the Corps" and "The Corps is Your Friend" appear on screen for four frames. J. Michael Straczynski wanted the audience to recognize the subliminal message; "I had my staff find out what constitutes subliminal material—and it's two frames per second, which is illegal, you can't do things at that speed--so I went four frames per second".
- An early episode of The X-Files deals with a small town plagued by killings where the perpetrators are influenced by messages appearing on ATMs and other electronic devices. Mulder refers to the use of subliminal messages in several instances.
- In the Family Guy episode Mr. Griffin Goes to Washington jokes about subliminal messages about smoking on television. It shows an old black and white TV show whose dialogue is repeatedly interrupted by a suited man stating "Smoke" and later "Are you smoking yet?" in a monotone voice. Later in the episode, when Peter is arguing with his bosses about smoking, the same man interrupts while saying "Smoke."
- The advertising element is mocked in Terry Pratchett's Discworld novel Moving Pictures, when, to please a sponsor, a movie producer inserts a still image lasting several minutes of a serving of spare ribs. The producer reasoned that if showing just a few frames would have a positive impact, showing it for several minutes would have a huge effect.
- Subliminal psychological influence is also referenced frequently by the British mentalist Derren Brown who claims its use as the basis of some of his effects. His declared methods are often decoys to divert attention from the real workings of his effects.
- In the episode "With Fans Like These..." of the animated TV show Kappa Mikey, Lily and Gonard threaten Guano made the public do their bidding by using subliminal messages in a fish stick commercial.
- Subliminal encoding is the pretext of the television show Chuck. The main character receives an e-mail in which thousands and thousands of pictures flash right before his eyes, resulting in an ability to 'mind flash' on certain things, for example a ring or a picture of someone.
- In an episode of The IT Crowd, Douglas attempts to seduce Jen by putting a quick flash of his photo into a presentation.
- Sue Townsend's 1992 novel/play The Queen and I is based on an alternate reality in which a leftist government takes power in the UK by the use of subliminal messages via television.
- The entire plot of Thomas Stratton's "Man From U. N. C. L. E. #12: The Mind-Twisters Affair" is based upon the idea of subliminal messages.
- In a novel called "Quiller Barracuda," in the popular series about the fictional English intelligence officer who uses the cryptonym Quiller, the character contends with a plot by foreign economic interests to influence US presidential election results by using television commercials altered to include subliminal messages.
- In the popular Tripod trilogy of science fiction books for children written by John Christopher, some and yet not all of the books indicate that subliminal messaging via television was a key part of the alien invasion strategy used by the race that humans knew only as "the Masters." Christopher later writes a prequel to the series, and the TV program in question was identified as "The Trippy Show, a show apparently aimed at young people."
- The episode Gary Takes a Bath of the Nickelodeon series SpongeBob SquarePants had a scene based on subliminal stimuli. SpongeBob planned to assault Gary's mind with subliminals. It showed images of a shower head, a bath, and soap. After those, it unintentionally cut to an image of a grinning cross-eyed girl for comedic effect. After that, it cut back to SpongeBob and Gary, with SpongeBob saying "Sorry you had to see that one".
- In the Gravity Falls episode Boyz Crazy, Wendy breaks up with Robbie, and he plays a song for her, and she falls back in love with him. Dipper and Stan play the song backward, revealing a subliminal message "You are now under my control. Your mind is mine." They then play the reversed song for Wendy and she breaks up with him again.
- In The Amazing World of Gumball episode The Spoiler, Anais puts on a Japanese program and asks Gumball if he'll take her to the movies. For one frame the program flashes "YES". Gumball says no. Anais asks, "But what about the subliminal message?" Gumball answers, "I don't understand Japanese."
- The December 16, 1973 episode of Columbo, titled "Double Exposure", is based on subliminal messaging: it is used by the murderer, Dr. Bart Kepple, a motivational research specialist, played by Robert Culp, to lure his victim out of his seat during the viewing of a promotional film and by Lt. Columbo to bring Kepple back to the crime scene and incriminate him. Lt. Columbo is shown how subliminal cuts work in a scene mirroring James Vicary's experiment.
