= Hazel Rose Markus =

American psychologist

- Born: 1949 (age 76–77); London, England
- Education: University of Michigan
- Spouse: Robert Zajonc
- Scientific career
- Fields: Social psychology
- Workplaces: Stanford University
- Thesis: Self Schemas, Behavioral Inference, and the Processing of Social Information (1975)
- Doctoral advisor: Robert Zajonc
- Doctoral students: Victoria Plaut

Hazel June Linda Rose Markus (born 1949) is an American social psychologist and a pioneer in the field of cultural psychology. She is the Davis-Brack Professor in the Behavioral Sciences at Stanford University in Stanford, California. She is also a founder and faculty director of Stanford SPARQ, a "do tank" that partners with industry leaders to tackle disparities and inspire culture change using insights from behavioral science. She is a founder and former director of the Research Institute of the Center for Comparative Studies in Race and Ethnicity (CCSRE). Her research focuses on how culture shapes mind and behavior. She examines how many forms of culture (e.g., region of origin, ethnicity, race, social class, gender and occupation) influence the self, and in turn, how we think, feel, and act.

Markus is a member of the National Academy of Sciences, a member of the American Academy of Arts and Sciences, and a Corresponding Fellow of the British Academy. A former president of the Society for Personality and Social Psychology, she is a recipient of the Donald T. Campbell Award, the Society of Experimental Social Psychology Distinguished Scientist Award, and the American Psychological Association Distinguished Scientific Contribution Award. Markus is a Fellow of the American Psychological Association and the Association for Psychological Science. Recent books include Doing Race: 21 Essays for the 21st Century, Facing Social Class: How Societal Rank Influences Interaction, and Clash!: How to Thrive in a Multicultural World. In 2025, she was elected to the American Philosophical Society.

== Early life and education ==
Markus was born Hazel June Linda Rose in London, England. Her family later moved to Southern California. She received her bachelor's degree in psychology from San Diego State University, where she initially wanted to pursue a career in journalism. Following a demonstration in a Psychology 101 class on the formidable power of expectations to shape what you see and hear, she changed her major to psychology, holding onto her fascination with the role of the media and other aspects of culture in shaping the self. She earned her doctorate in social psychology from the University of Michigan.

== Career and contributions ==
It is no small feat to be able to see human nature for what it is, to shake off the scales of one's own culture and existing scientific paradigms, and point the way for others, but this is an important part of Hazel's achievement. (John Bargh)

Markus became a faculty member in the psychology department and a research scientist at the Research Center for Group Dynamics at the Institute for Social Research and where together with Richard Nisbett she established the Culture and Cognition Program. With her husband, the late social psychologist Robert Zajonc, Markus moved to the Stanford department of psychology in 1994.

Markus' most significant contributions to social psychology are her conceptualizations of the self-schema, of possible selves, the theory of how cultures and selves shape each other, the distinction between the independent and interdependent selves, and the culture cycle.

=== Self schemas ===
Making sense of one’s own behavior in particular domains results in the formation of cognitive structures about the self, or self-schemas. These interpretive structures reflect one’s own observations as well as those offered by the social context, and lend coherence, meaning, and form to current and future experience. Self-schemas facilitate self-relevant judgments and decisions, contain easily retrievable behavioral evidence, provide a basis for the confident self-prediction of behavior in schema related domains and help people resist schema inconsistent information.

=== Possible selves ===
Possible selves represent individuals' ideas of what they might become, what they would like to become, and what they are afraid of becoming. They provide conceptual links among cognition, emotion, and motivation. They provide a context for understanding one's current self and are incentives and guides for future behavior.

=== Selves are culturally shaped shapers ===
Building on the work of earlier cultural psychologists Markus, together with social and cultural psychologist Shinobu Kitayama, has expanded the field of cultural psychology and examined how individuals’ many cultural contexts both shape and reflect individuals' emotions, cognitions, motivations, relationships, as well as their physical and mental health and their well-being.

=== Independent and interdependent selves ===
Markus and Kitayama distinguished between independent and interdependent selves, and among the different types of social contexts that give rise to these different ways of being a self or an agent. Selves in European American middle class contexts, for example, tend to emphasize independence and to view people as fundamentally separate individuals, unique, influencing others and their environments, free from constraints, and equal to others. Selves crafted in more interdependent national contexts such as Japan, by contrast, tend to view people as fundamentally relational, similar to others, adjusting to their situations, rooted in traditions and obligations, and ranked in hierarchies. People in all contexts become selves through their interactions with others and the social context. The difference rests with the nature of their relationships with others and their contexts.

With former students and colleagues, Markus validated the distinction between independent and interdependent ways of being with many laboratory studies comparing people in middle class European American contexts with those in East or South Asian contexts, showing, for example how cultural contexts influence choice, i.e., what is chosen, what choice means, the consequences of exercising choice or having choice denied, and how the opportunity for expression of preferences through choice is particularly characteristic of European American middle class contexts. Markus was among the first in social psychology to investigate social class as a significant cultural context and reveal how the ideas and practices of well-resourced middle or upper class contexts tend to foster independent selves, while ideas and practices common in less resourced, low income or working class contexts tend to foster interdependent selves. These studies also illuminate the powerful role of mainstream institutions in the U.S., such as universities, in fostering independent ways of being.

=== The culture cycle ===
Their research conceptualizes cultures as multilayered cycles of individuals, interactions, institutions, and ideas. Different blends of these culture cycles create different forms of agency. As described by Markus and Conner, the culture cycle is a model that represents culture as a system of four interacting layers. Culture includes the ideas, institutions, and interactions that guide individuals’ thoughts, feelings, and actions.

From the left side, the ideas, institutions, and interactions of an individual’s mix of cultures shapes the “I”, so that a person thinks, feels, and acts in ways that reflect and perpetuate these cultures. From the right side, I’s (i.e., individuals, selves, minds) create (i.e., reinforce, resist, change) cultures to which other people adapt.

The “individuals level” is the usual focus of psychologists and includes thoughts, beliefs, attitudes, feelings, emotions, biases, motives, goals, identities, and self-concepts. The “interactions level” is the part of the culture cycle in which most people live their lives. As people interact with other people and with human-made products (artifacts), their ways of life manifest in everyday situations that follow seldom-spoken norms about the right ways to behave at home, school, work, worship, and play. The next layer of culture is made up of the “institutions” level,” within which everyday interactions take place. Institutions spell out and formalize the roles for a society and include government, religious, legal, economic, education, and scientific institutions. The last and most abstract layer of the culture cycle is the “ideas level,” and it is made up of the pervasive, often invisible, historically derived and collectively held ideologies, beliefs, values, narratives and mindsets about what is good, right, moral, natural, powerful, real and necessary. These ideas inform institutions, interactions, and ultimately, the I’s. Culture cycles are embedded in ecological systems, and all of the systems—within the individual and without—are coevolving.

Markus and Conner analyzed eight cultural divides that are consequential for people’s answers to the universal questions of identity and belonging (i.e., “who am i/are we?”). These include: East versus West, Global North versus Global South, men versus women, rich versus poor, whites versus people of color, businesses versus governments and nonprofits, liberal religious groups versus conservative religious groups, and coasts versus heartlands. Using a blend of experiments, surveys, and analyses of cultural products, they show that one set of culture cycles (i.e., those of the West, the Global North, men, the rich or middle-class, whites, businesses, liberal religious groups, and the coasts) tend to promote independence, while the culture cycles of the less well-resourced and less powerful sides of these divides tend to promote interdependence. Any given person’s social orientation toward independence or interdependence will depend on that person’s mix of these culture cycles and on which ones are salient at a given time or situation. Given the hegemony of independence in American ideas and institutions, along with the historical dominance of color, culture and gender blindness, the more interdependent tendencies that arise from intersections of national culture with social class, race and ethnicity, and gender may go unrecognized and can be misunderstood and stigmatized.

=== Race and diversity ===
Markus has also explored concepts of race, ethnicity, diversity, colorblindness and multiculturalism. With literary scholar Paula Moya, she examined what race and ethnicity are, how they work, and why achieving a just society requires taking account of them. In their book, Doing Race, they emphasize that race is not something that people or groups have, or are, but rather a set of actions that people do. Specifically, race is a dynamic system of historically-derived and institutionalized ideas and practices. She has studied both the pride and prejudice consequences of racial identities, mixed racial identities, and the role of narratives and practices of colorblindness and multiculturalism.

At Stanford SPARQ, Markus and co-director Jennifer Eberhardt work with research scientists to design and implement programs and interventions that address police-community trust, trust and community building in universities, mobility from poverty, reducing bias in financial services, and strategies for cultural change.

== Selected publications ==
=== Books ===
- Jones, E. E., Farina, A., Hastorf, A., Markus, H., Miller, D., & Scott, R. (1984). Social stigma: The psychology of marked relationships. San Francisco, CA: W. H. Freeman & Co.
- Kitayama, S., & Markus, H. R. (Eds.) (1994). Emotion and culture: Empirical studies of mutual influence. Washington, DC: American Psychological Association.
- Shweder, R., Minow, M., & Markus, H. R. (Eds.) (2002). Engaging cultural differences: The multicultural challenge in liberal democracies. New York, NY: Russell Sage Foundation.
- Shweder, R., Minow, M., & Markus, H. R. (2008). Just schools: Pursuing equal education in societies of difference. New York, NY: Russell Sage Foundation.
- Markus, H. R., & Moya, P. (2010). Doing Race: 21 essays for the 21st century. New York, NY: W. W. Norton & Co.
- Fiske, S. & Markus, H. R. (2012). Facing social class: How societal rank influences interaction. New York, NY: Russell Sage Foundation.
- Markus, H. R., & Conner, A. L. (2014). Clash! How to thrive in a multicultural world. New York, NY: Penguin Group (Plume).
- Fein, S., Kassin, S., & Markus, H. R. (2016). Social Psychology (10th ed.). New York, NY: Houghton Mifflin Company.

=== Journal articles ===
- Markus, H. (1977). Self-schemata and processing information about the self. Journal of Personality and Social Psychology, 35, 63-78.
- Markus, H. (1980). The self in thought and memory. In D. M. Wegner & R. R. Vallacher (Eds.), The self in social psychology (pp. 102–130). Hillsdale, New Jersey: Erlbaum.
- Markus, H., & Zajonc, R. B. (1985). The cognitive perspective in social psychology. In G. Lindzey & E. Aronson (Eds.), Handbook of social psychology (pp. 137–229, 3rd ed.). New York: Random House.
- Markus, H., & Kunda, Z. (1986). Stability and malleability in the self-concept in the perception of others. Journal of Personality and Social Psychology, 51(4), 858-866.
- Markus, H., & Nurius, P. (1986). Possible selves. American Psychologist, 41, 954-969.
- Markus, H., & Kitayama, S. (1991). Culture and the self: Implications for cognition, emotion, and motivation. Psychological Review, 98, 224-253.
- Oyserman, D., & Markus, H. R. (1993). The sociocultural self. In J. Suls (Ed.), Psychological perspectives on the self (Vol. 4, pp. 187–220). Hillsdale, NJ: Erlbaum.
- Markus, H. R., & Kitayama, S. (1994). A collective fear of the collective: Implications for selves and theories of selves. Personality and Social Psychology Bulletin, 20, 568-579.
- Markus, H. R., Mullally, P., & Kitayama, S. (1997). Selfways: Diversity in modes of cultural participation. In U. Neisser & D. Jopling (Eds.), The conceptual self in context: Culture, experience, self-understanding (pp. 13–61). Cambridge: Cambridge University Press.
- Markus, H. R., Kitayama, S., & Heiman, R. (1997). Culture and “basic” psychological principles. In E. T. Higgins & A. W. Kruglanski (Eds.), Social psychology: Handbook of basic principles (pp. 857–913). New York: Guilford.
- Fiske, A., Kitayama, S., Markus, H. R., & Nisbett, R. E. (1998). The cultural matrix of social psychology. In D. Gilbert, S. Fiske, & G. Lindzey (Eds.), The Handbook of Social Psychology, Vol. 2 (4th ed., pp. 915–981). San Francisco: McGraw-Hill.
- Heine, S. J., Lehman, D. R., Markus, H. R., & Kitayama, S. (1999). Is there a universal need for positive self-regard? Psychological Review, 106(4), 766-794.
- Kim, H., & Markus, H. R. (1999). Deviance or uniqueness, harmony or conformity? A cultural analysis. Journal of Personality and Social Psychology, 77(4), 785-800.
- Markus, H. R., Steele, C. M., & Steele, D. M. (2000). Colorblindness as a barrier to inclusion: Assimilation and nonimmigrant minorities. Daedalus, 129(4), 233-259.
- Kim, H., & Markus, H. R. (2002). Freedom of speech and freedom of silence: A cultural analysis of talking. In R. Shweder, M. Minow, & H. Markus (Eds.), Engaging cultural differences: The multicultural challenge in liberal democracies (pp. 432–452). New York: Russell Sage Foundation.
- Markus, H. R., & Kitayama, S. (2003). Models of agency: Sociocultural diversity in the construction of action. In V. Murphy-Berman & J. Berman (Eds.), The 49th Annual Nebraska symposium on motivation: Cross-cultural differences in perspectives on self (pp. 1–57). Lincoln: University of Nebraska Press.
- Adams, G., & Markus, H. R. (2004). Toward a conception of culture suitable for a social psychology of culture. In M. Schaller & C. S. Crandall (Eds.), The psychological foundations of culture (pp. 335–360). Hillsdale, NJ: Lawrence Erlbaum Associates.
- Conner Snibbe, A., & Markus, H. R. (2005). You can’t always get what you want: Social class, agency and choice. Journal of Personality and Social Psychology, 88(4), 703-720.
- Schwartz, B., Markus, H. R., & Snibbe, A. C. (2006). Is freedom just another word for many things to buy? The New York Times. February 26.
- Markus, H. (2008). Pride, prejudice, and ambivalence: Toward a unified theory of race and ethnicity. American Psychologist, 63(8), 651-670.
- Savani, K., Markus, H., & Conner A. L. (2008). Let your preference be your guide? Preferences and choices are more tightly linked for North Americans than for Indians. Journal of Personality and Social Psychology, 95(4), 861-876.
- Stephens, N., Hamedani, M., Markus, H., Bergsieker, H. B., & Eloul, L. (2009). Why did they “choose” to stay? Perspectives of Hurricane Katrina observers and survivors. Psychological Science, 20, 878-886.
- Savani, K., Markus, H. R., Naidu, N. V. R., Kumar, S., & Berlia, N. (2010). What counts as a choice? U.S. Americans are more likely than Indians to construe actions as choices. Psychological Science, 14(3), 391-398.
- Markus, H. R. (2010). Who am I?: Race, ethnicity and identity. In H. Markus & P. Moya (Eds.), Doing race: 21 essays for the 21st century. New York: W.W. Norton.
- Savani, K., Stephens, N., & Markus, H.R. (2011). The unanticipated interpersonal and societal consequences of choice: Victim-blaming and reduced support for the public good. Psychological Science, 22(6), 795-802.
- Stephens, N. M., Fryberg, S. A., Markus, H. R., Johnson, C. S., & Covarrubias, R. (2012). Unseen disadvantage: How the American universities’ focus on independence undermines the academic performance of first-generation college students. Journal of Personality and Social Psychology, 102, 1178-1197.
- Plaut, V. C., Markus, H. R., Treadway, J. R., & Fu, A. S. (2012). The cultural construction of self and well-being: A tale of two cities. Personality and Social Psychology Bulletin, 38(12), 1644-1658.
- Stephens, N. M., Markus, H. R., & Fryberg, S. A. (2012). Social class disparities in health and education: Reducing inequality by applying a sociocultural self model of behavior. Psychological Review, 119(4), 723-744.
- Hamedani, M. G., Markus, H. R., & Fu, A. S. (2013). In the land of the free, interdependent action undermines motivation. Psychological Science.
