= Pre-attentive processing =

Subconscious accumulation of information from the environment

Pre-attentive processing is the subconscious accumulation of information from the environment. All available information is pre-attentively processed. Then, the brain filters and processes what is important. Information that has the highest salience (a stimulus that stands out the most) or relevance to what a person is thinking about is selected for further and more complete analysis by conscious (attentive) processing. Understanding how pre-attentive processing works is useful in advertising, in education, and for prediction of cognitive ability.

== Pure-capture and contingent-capture ==
The reasons are unclear as to why certain information proceeds from pre-attentive to attentive processing while other information does not. It is generally accepted that the selection involves an interaction between the salience of a stimulus and person's current intentions and/or goals. Two models of pre-attentive processing are pure-capture and contingent-capture.

The "pure-capture" model focuses on stimulus salience. If certain properties of a stimulus stand out from its background, the stimulus has a higher chance of being selected for attentive processing. This is sometimes referred to as "bottom-up" processing, as it is the properties of the stimuli which affect selection. Since things that affect pre-attentive processing do not necessarily correlate with things that affect attention, stimulus salience may be more important than conscious goals. For example, pre-attentive processing is slowed by sleep deprivation while attention, although less focused, is not slowed. Furthermore, when searching for a particular visual stimulus among a variety of visual distractions, people often have more trouble finding what they are looking for if one or more of the distractions is particularly salient. For example, it is easier to locate a bright, green circle (which is salient) among distractor circles if they are all grey (a bland color) than it is to locate a green circle among distractor circles if some are red (also salient colour). This is thought to occur because the salient red circles attract our attention away from the target green circle. However, this is difficult to prove because when given a target (like the green circle) to search for in a laboratory experiment, participants may generalize the task to searching for anything that stands out, rather than solely searching for the target. If this happens, the conscious goal becomes finding anything that stands out, which would direct the person's attention towards red distractor circles as well as the green target. This means that a person's goal, rather than the salience of the stimuli, could be causing the delayed ability to find the target.

The "contingent-capture" model emphasizes the idea that a person's current intentions and/or goals affect the speed and efficiency of pre-attentive processing. The brain directs an individual's attention towards stimuli with features that fit in with their goals. Consequently, these stimuli will be processed faster at the pre-attentive stage and will be more likely to be selected for attentive processing. Since this model focuses on the importance of conscious processes (rather than properties of the stimulus itself) in selecting information for attentive processing, it is sometimes called "top-down" selection. In support of this model, it has been shown that a target stimulus can be located faster if it is preceded by the presentation of a similar, priming stimulus. For example, if an individual is shown the color green and then required to find a green circle among distractors, the initial exposure to the color will make it easier to find the green circle. This is because they are already thinking about and envisioning the color green, so when it shows up again as the green circle, their brain readily directs its attention towards it. This suggests that processing an initial stimulus speeds up a person's ability to select a similar target from pre-attentive processing. However, it could be that the speed of pre-attentive processing itself is not affected by the first stimulus, but rather that people are simply able to quickly abandon dissimilar stimuli, enabling them to re-engage to the correct target more quickly. This would mean that the difference in reaction time occurs at the attentive level, after pre-attentive processing and stimulus selection has already taken place.

== Vision ==
Information for pre-attentive processing is detected through the senses. In the visual system, the receptive fields at the back of the eye (retina) transfer the image via axons to the thalamus, specifically the lateral geniculate nuclei. The image then travels to the primary visual cortex and continues on to be processed by the visual association cortex. At each stage, the image is processed with increasing complexity. Pre-attentive processing starts with the retinal image; this image is magnified as it moves from retina to the cortex of the brain. Shades of light and dark are processed in the lateral geniculate nuclei of the thalamus. Simple and complex cells in the brain process boundary and surface information by deciphering the image's contrast, orientation, and edges. When the image hits the fovea, it is highly magnified, facilitating object recognition. The images in the periphery are less clear but help to create a complete image used for scene perception.

Visual scene segmentation is a pre-attentive process where stimuli are grouped together into specific objects against a background. Figure and background regions of an image activate different processing centres: figures use the lateral occipital areas (which involve object processing) and background engages dorso-medial areas.

Visual pre-attentive processing uses a distinct memory mechanism. When a stimulus is presented consecutively, the stimulus is perceived at a faster rate than if different stimuli are presented consecutively. The theory behind this is called the dimension-weighting account (DWA) where each time a specific stimulus (i.e. color) is presented it contributes to the weight of the stimuli. More presentations increase the weight of the stimuli, and therefore, subsequently decrease the reaction time to the stimulus. The dimensional-weighting system, which calculates pre-attentive processing for our visual system, codes the stimulus and thus directs attention to the stimulus with the most weight.

Visual pre-attentive processing is also involved in the perception of emotion. Human beings are social creatures and are very adept at critiquing facial expressions. We have the ability to unconsciously process emotional stimuli and equate the stimuli, such as a face, with meaning.

== Audition ==
The auditory system is also very important in accumulating information for pre-attentive processing. When a person's eardrum is struck by incoming sound waves, it vibrates. This sends messages, via the auditory nerve, to the brain for pre-attentive processing. The ability to adequately filter information from pre-attentive processing to attentive processing is necessary for the normal development of social skills. For acoustic pre-attentive processing, the temporal cortex was believed to be the main site of activation; however, recent evidence has indicated involvement of the frontal cortex as well. The frontal cortex is predominantly associated with attentional processing, but it may also be involved in pre-attentive processing of complex or salient acoustic stimuli. For example, detecting slight variations in complex musical patterns has been shown to activate the right ventromedial prefrontal cortex.

It has been shown that in acoustic pre-attentive processing there is some degree of lateralization. The left hemisphere responds more to temporal acoustic information whereas the right hemisphere responds to the frequency of auditory information. Also, there is lateralization in the perception of speech which is left hemisphere dominant for pre-attentive processing.

== Multisensory integration ==
Vision, sound, smell, touch, and taste are processed together pre-attentively when more than one sensory stimuli are present. This multisensory integration increases activity in the superior temporal sulcus (STS), thalamus, and superior colliculus. Specifically, the pre-attentive process of multisensory integration works jointly with attention to activate brain regions such as the STS. Multisensory integration seems to give a person the advantage of greater comprehension if both auditory and visual stimuli are being processed together. It is also affected by what a person pays attention to and their current goals.

== Plasticity ==
Training can lead to changes in activity and brain structures involved in pre-attentive processing. Professional musicians, in particular, show larger ERP (Event-related potential) responses to deviations in auditory stimuli and have possibly related structural differences in their brains (Heschl's gyrus, corpus callosum, and pyramidal tracts). This plasticity of pre-attentive processing has also been shown in perception. Using EEG (electroencephalography) methods in pre-attentive colour perception, a study observed how easy it was for bilinguals to adapt to the linguistic constructs of a different culture. This means that pre-attentive processes are not hard-wired but malleable.

== Deficits ==
Deficits in the transition from pre-attentive processing to attentive processing are associated with disorders such as schizophrenia, Alzheimer's disease, and autism. Abnormal prefrontal cortex function in individuals with schizophrenia results in the inability to use pre-attentive processing to recognize familiar auditory stimuli as non-threatening. Individuals with schizophrenia with positive symptoms have a greater capability of pre-attentively processing emotionally negative odors. This heightened ability to distinguish odors seems to be involved in their hypersensitivity to threatening situations. Alzheimer's disease is typically thought to affect high-level brain functioning (like memory) but can also have negative impacts on visual pre-attentive processing. Some of the difficulties with social interaction seen in autistic individuals may be due to an impairment in filtration of pre-attentive auditory information. For example, they often have difficulty following a conversation as they cannot distinguish which parts are important and are easily distracted by other sounds.

== See also ==
- Response priming
- Subliminal stimuli
- Unconscious cognition
- Unconscious thought theory § Criticism of UTT
