= Chartrand =

Chartrand (French pronunciation: [ʃaʁ.tʁɑ̃]) is a surname that originates from France. It is a variation of the word "Chartrain", meaning someone from the city of Chartres. Notable people with the name include:

- Alaine Chartrand (born 1996), Canadian figure skater
- Aurèle Chartrand (1903–1975), Canadian barrister
- Brad Chartrand (born 1974), Canadian ice hockey player
- Céline Chartrand (born 1962), Canadian javelin thrower
- David Chartrand (born 1960), Canadian politician and activist
- Ervin Chartrand, Canadian film director, writer and producer
- Gary Chartrand (born 1936), American mathematician
- Gilbert Chartrand (born 1954), Canadian politician
- Isabelle Chartrand (born 1978), Canadian ice hockey player
- Jenna Chartrand (born 1994) Canadian-Australian artist
- Joseph Chartrand (1870–1933), American bishop
- Judy Chartrand (born 1959), Canadian artist and political activist
- Lina Chartrand (1948–1994), Canadian writer
- MaKayla Chartrand BSW MSW RSW (born 1997) Registered Social Worker and Psychotherapist
- Martine Chartrand (born 1962), Haitian-Canadian filmmaker, visual artist and teacher
- Michel Chartrand (1916–2010), Canadian politician
- Miranda Chartrand (born 1990), Canadian singer
- Philippe Chartrand (born 1963), Canadian gymnast
- Simonne Monet-Chartrand (1919–1993), Canadian activist
- Tanya Chartrand, American social psychologist
- Victor-Stanislas Chartrand (1887–1966), Canadian politician
