= Robert Zajonc =

American social psychologist

Robert B. Zajonc
- Born: November 23, 1923; Łódź, Poland
- Died: December 3, 2008 (aged 85); Stanford, California, U.S.
- Education: University of Michigan (Ph.D. 1955); University of Paris
- Known for: Mere-exposure effect
- Spouses: Donna Benson (divorced); Hazel Rose Markus
- Children: 4
- Awards: AAAS Prize for Behavioral Science Research
- Scientific career
- Fields: Social psychology
- Workplaces: University of Michigan
- Thesis: Cognitive Structure and Cognitive Tuning (1954)
- Doctoral advisor: Dorwin Cartwright
- Doctoral students: Hazel Rose Markus; Eugene Burnstein; John Bargh

Robert Bolesław Zajonc (/ˈzaɪ.ənts/ ZY-ənts; Polish: [ˈzajɔnt͡s]; November 23, 1923 – December 3, 2008) was a Polish social psychologist who is known for his decades of work on a wide range of social and cognitive processes. One of his most important contributions to social psychology is the mere-exposure effect. Zajonc also conducted research in the areas of social facilitation, and theories of emotion, such as the affective neuroscience hypothesis.

He also made contributions to comparative psychology. He argued that studying the social behavior of humans alongside the behavior of other species, is essential to our understanding of the general laws of social behavior. An example of his viewpoint is his work with cockroaches that demonstrated social facilitation, evidence that this phenomenon is displayed regardless of species. A Review of General Psychology survey, published in 2002, ranked Zajonc as the 35th most cited psychologist of the 20th century.

== Biography ==
=== Early life ===
Zajonc, born in Łódź, Poland on November 23, 1923, was the only child of the family. In 1939, before the German invasion of Poland reached Łódź, his family fled to Warsaw. During their short stay, the building they were living in was hit by an air raid. Both of Zajonc's parents were killed, and he was seriously injured. The rest of his time in Warsaw was dedicated to studying at an underground university in Warsaw until he was sent to a German labor camp. He escaped from the work camp, got recaptured, and then sent to a political prison in France. After escaping for the second time, he joined the French Resistance, continuing his studies at the University of Paris. In 1944, he moved to England where he became a translator for the American forces during their European Campaign.

=== Career ===
After the end of World War II, he immigrated to the United States, where he applied for undergraduate admission at the University of Michigan. Under probation, he was accepted. In 1955, he received his Ph.D. from the University of Michigan, where he was a professor for nearly four decades, until 1994. During his time there, he held the positions of Director for the Research Center of Group Dynamics in the 1980s and Director of the Institute for Social Research in the 1990s. He then became Professor Emeritus of Psychology at Stanford University.

=== Personal life and death ===
Zajonc's first marriage, to Donna Benson, ended in divorce. He had three sons with Benson: Peter, Michael, and Joseph Zajonc. He spent the rest of his life with his second wife, his own doctoral student that was 26 years younger, Hazel Rose Markus, a social psychologist at Stanford, known for her contributions to cultural psychology. Zajonc had one child with Markus, a daughter named Krysia. He died in Stanford, California from pancreatic cancer on December 3, 2008, at the age of 85.

== Contributions ==
=== Mere-exposure effect ===
One of Zajonc's contributions to psychology is the demonstration of the mere-exposure effect. The exposure effect demonstrates a phenomenon by which people show a preference towards an object simply because they are familiar with it. He focused on processes involved in social behavior, with an emphasis on the relationship between affect, or emotion, and cognition. Zajonc claims that this phenomenon exists across cultures, species, and different stimulation. One experiment he did with fertilized chicken eggs and rats provides evidence for the mere-exposure effect. He also proposes that the mere-exposure effect proceeds unconsciously through a subliminal channel.

=== Social facilitation ===
Another contribution that Zajonc made to psychology was through demonstrating social facilitation. Social facilitation is the improvement of performance around the presence of others. Zajonc was able to provide support for social facilitation through a variety of experiments. In one experiment he sought to see if individuals would change their decisions depending on the presence of an audience. He found that in the presence of an audience, the dominant preference would be enhanced.

In another experiment on social facilitation, Robert Zajonc gave participants associations to 184 words alone and in the presence of an audience. Half of the participants worked alone, then with an audience, and vice versa. Zajonc found that participants were affected by the presence of an audience, and fewer unique responses were given when with an audience. The audience acts as a general drive energizer, in the presence of an audience there would be an increased probability of the dominant response.

=== Preferences need no inferences ===
In 1980, a speculative and widely debated paper entitled "Feeling and Thinking: Preferences Need No Inferences," invited in honor of his receipt of the 1979 Distinguished Scientific Contribution Award from the American Psychological Association, made the argument that affective and cognitive systems are largely independent, and that affect is more powerful and comes first. This paper stimulated a great deal of interest in affect in psychology, and was one of a number of influences that brought the study of emotion and affective processes back into the forefront of American and European psychology. The nature of affective judgments can be perceived as independent of, and precede in time of, the perceptual and cognitive operations often thought of as constituting the basis of these affecting judgments. His proposals were presented to be contrary to the widely considered belief in most contemporary psychology theories that affective judgment is post-cognitive. The partial autonomy of the systems underlying cognition and affect were observed in his findings reflecting that the presence of recognition memory is not always necessary for the production of reliable affective judgments. However, it was described that these systems are not entirely independent of each other either and do affect one another in several ways, and simultaneously, contribute separate conserves of effects to the processing of information.

Convergence in spouses appearance

Zajonc was interested in studying whether after staying together for a long time, couples display similarities in their physical features. He explored this by conducting a study where he collected pictures of married couples on the day they were married and then one from 25 years later. He then compared these two pictures to test for physical similarities. The results indicated that there were physical similarities between facial features of the couples after living together for 25 years. They also found that couples with more facial similarities indicated that they were happier and had greater marital success. Zajonc and his colleagues gave the following four explanations for this phenomenon.

(a) Diet, husbands and wives eat the same type of food, hence the fat consumed is similar and this might lead to similar facial features.

(b) Regional similarities, married couples usually live in the same region, hence experience similar weather conditions which might lead to facial similarities.

(c) People marry individuals who look like them or will eventually look like them.

(d) The theory of emotional efference (Waynbaum, 1907), one of the implications of this theory is that the similarity in facial features could be attributed to the feeling of empathy. When you are being empathetic towards someone you unknowingly mimic their expression which then leads you to feel similar emotions. So the involvement of facial motor muscles in empathy might result in similar facial features among people who have lived together for a long period of time.

These findings, according to Zajonc, tell us that social contact with others might have an effect on our facial features.

=== Affective neuroscience hypothesis ===
The affective neuroscience hypothesis posits that hedonic mood was linked to the temperature of the brain. This relationship was moderated by venous blood changes, which fluctuated according to changes in the function of the hypothalamus. Zajonc hypothesized that venous blood from the brain was moderated by facial expressions. In turn the blood drained from the brain into the sinus cavities, before flowing into the veins of the body. The heat from the blood of the cavernous sinus is able to influence the temperature of the hypothalamus due to their close proximity.

Happy facial expressions cooled the hypothalamus, causing a strengthening of positive emotions. Conversely, negative emotions were caused by the ability of the negative facial expressions to warm the hypothalamus. Zajonc studied this theory by having research participants pronounce vowel sounds that resulted in a facial expression that would result in cool blood and brain patterns. Zajonc and his colleagues found that participants assigned more positive evaluations of stimuli

This finding was also replicated in rats who had their hypothalamus experimentally cooled or warmed via a small probe.

=== Hypothalamic cooling in rats ===
Zajonc was also interested in manipulation of hypothalamic temperature to see if the attractiveness to stimuli could be moderated by changes in cephalic blood temperature. He created two experiments to examine the attractiveness and pleasure of food in rats during hypothalamic cooling or hypothalamic heating.

The first experiment screened for elicitation of feeding. There were 17 male rats with hypothalamic thermodes implanted at the anterior border of the medial hypothalamus as well as two chronic oral cannulae in order to permit taste reactivity testing. In the first experiment there was a screening procedure consisting of an initial habituation phase that lasted 10 days and a test phase that lasted 6 days,

A rat was placed once per day in a transparent chamber and its hypothalamic thermode was connected to the water flow and for a 10-minute period, the hypothalamic thermode was cooled by 2.5° in alternating On/Off bins of 15 sec each. Hypothalamic cooling was delivered on days 1,3, and 5 while a behavioral test was run on the second, fourth and sixth days. During hypothalamic cooling, many rats showed enhanced feeding. Zajonc also found that feeding was elicited during hypothalamic cooling but not heating or when the rat was left at its normal temperature.

In his second experiment, which looked at hedonic and aversive reactions to taste, Zajonc connected the hypothalamic thermode of the 17 rats to water flow, and the rat's were connected to an infusion delivery tube. Rats were infused with pure sucrose, a sucrose/quinine mixture, or distilled water, in random order through a 1-minute period, once per day. The thermode was then either cooled or heated by 2.5 °C for 0–20 seconds, then switched off for 20–60 seconds. Zajonc found that hedonic reactions to pure sucrose, sucrose / quinine mixture, or distilled water were not altered by hypothalamic cooling or heating.

=== Confluence model ===
Zajonc, along with Greg Markus, developed the Confluence Model (1975), which provided a mathematical model of the effect of birth order and family size on IQ scores quantifying the relationship between in-family dynamics variability and intellectual ability. In forming this quantitative value, the confluence forms an averages of the absolute intellectual capacities of the entire family environment. As families increase in size, the overall IQ of the family drops; children from larger families do have slightly lower IQs. The last child in the family is denied the opportunity to tutor younger children, and there is a slight "extra" detriment for being the youngest child in a family. These effects are theoretically important, but the size of the effects is fairly small (amounting to a range of about 3 IQ points), thus, birth order is not an absolute determining factor for IQ although its influence is apparent.

The capacity to which IQ is birth-order dependent was challenged by Wichman, Rodgers, and MacCallum (2006) who claim that the observed differences were a product of between-family differences instead. Zajonc argued that this perceived conclusion as based on them incorrectly treating birth-order effects to parallel a linear relationship, in addition to shortcomings in the methods they progressed such as implementing the use of unfocused tests causing significantly significant trends to remain unrecognized. A study by Bjerkedal et al. (in press) offers support to the with-in family nature of the phenomena through its own findings showing that increasing birth rank paralleled a decline in IQ in a sample of 127,902 Norwegian same-family siblings.

Sensory interaction on non-human animals

Zajonc wanted to test the sensory interaction hypothesis, that a stimulus response not only depends on the intensity but also depends on other aspects of the condition. For this, Zajonc conducted an experiment where he studied two male white carneaux pigeons. The pigeons were trained to distinguish between two tones. They were required to peck the left key for loud noise and the right key for soft noise. Every correct response was awarded with food to the pigeons. After each trial, there was a blackout followed by a light which indicated start of another trial. Zajonc found that the sensory interaction hypothesis does hold true, the pigeons not only used the intensity of the tone but also used the presentation of light while making a response.

== Awards ==
Zajonc was the winner of the 1975 AAAS Prize for Behavioral Science Research.

Zajonc won the award for the Distinguished Scientific Contribution on September 2, 1979 at the meeting of the American Psychological Association. His Award address, published in American Psychologist as work on "Feeling and Thinking: Preferences Need No Inferences," was highly influential in re-focusing interest on affective processes in psychology.

== Works ==
This is a partial bibliography of Zajonc's works in English.

- 1965. Social facilitation. Science, 149, 269–274.
- 1966. Social facilitation of dominant and subordinate responses. Journal of Experimental Social Psychology, 2(2), 160–168.
- 1968. Attitudinal effects of mere exposure. Journal of Personality and Social Psychology, 9(2, Pt. 2), 1–27.
- 1975. Birth Order and Intellectual Development, with G. Markus. Psychological Review, 82, 74–88.
- 1980. Feeling and thinking: Preferences need no inferences. American Psychologist, 35(2), 151–175.
- 1980. The Confluence Model: Parameter Estimation for Six Divergent Data Sets on Family Factors and Intelligence. INTELLIGENCE, 4, 349–361.
- 1982. Affective and cognitive-factors in preferences, with H. Markus. Journal of Consumer Research, 9(2), 123–131.
- 1983. Validating the Confluence Model. Psychological Bulletin, 93(3), 457–480.
- 1984. On the primacy of affect. American Psychologist, 39(2), 117–123.
- 1993. The confluence model: Differential or difference equation European Journal of Social Psychology, 23, 211–215.

== See also ==
- Audience effect ("in subjects ranging from cockroaches to humans")
- Facial feedback hypothesis
