= Automaticity =

Ability to do things without occupying the mind with the low-level details required

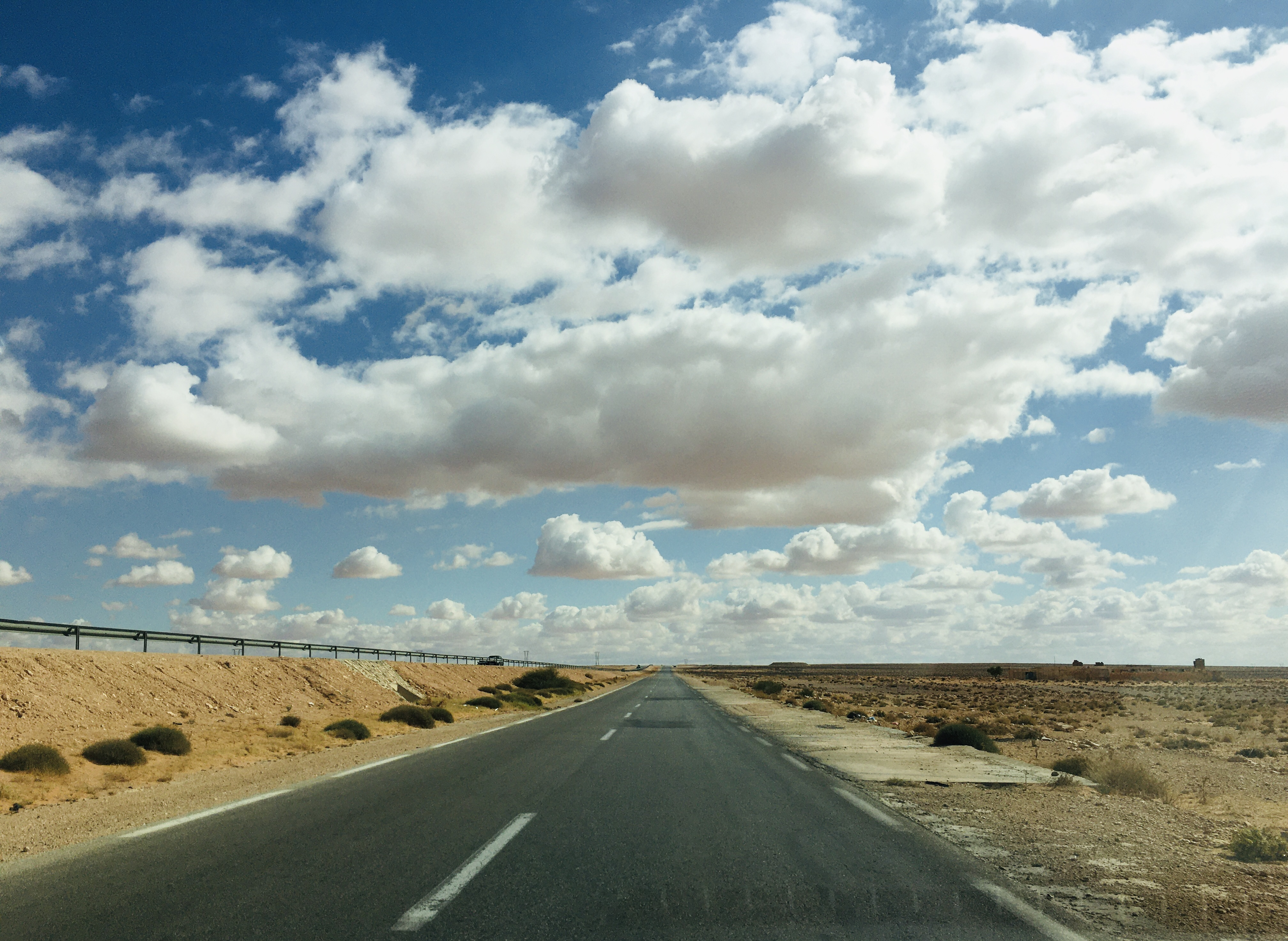
Driving in certain conditions may trigger 'highway hypnosis' in some people, which is an example of automaticity. Those who experience highway hypnosis often drive for long distances, responding to external events in the correct and safe manner, but have no memory of the time spent under highway hypnosis as a result.

In the field of psychology, automaticity is the ability to do things without occupying the mind with the low-level details required, allowing it to become an automatic response pattern or habit. It is usually the result of learning, repetition, and practice. Examples of tasks carried out by 'muscle memory' often involve some degree of automaticity.

Examples of automaticity are common activities such as walking, speaking, bicycle-riding, assembly-line work, and driving a car (the last of these sometimes being termed "highway hypnosis"). After an activity is sufficiently practiced, it is possible to focus the mind on other activities or thoughts while undertaking an automatized activity (for example, holding a conversation or planning a speech while driving a car).

== Characteristics ==
John Bargh (1994), based on over a decade of research, suggested that four characteristics usually accompany automatic behavior:

Awareness
A person may be unaware of the mental process that is occurring.
Intentionality
A person may not intentionally initiate a mental process.
Efficiency
Automatic mental processes tend to have a low cognitive load, requiring relatively low mental resources.
Controllability
A person may not have the ability to stop or alter a process after initiation.

Bargh states that these are simply common characteristics; not all are needed for a process to be considered automatic. For instance, stereotype activation has been described as an automatic process: it is unintentional and efficient, requiring little effort. However stereotype activation is accompanied by above chance awareness and if conflicting processing goals are available then it becomes controlled. Therefore, stereotype activation only satisfies two of Bargh's criteria, but is still considered to be an example of automatic processing.

== In reading ==
LaBerge and Samuels (1974) helped explain how reading fluency develops. Automaticity refers to knowing how to perform some arbitrary task at a competent level without requiring conscious effort — i.e., it is a form of unconscious competence.

Moreover, if the student is automatic or is "a skilled reader, multiple tasks are being performed at the same time, such as decoding the words, comprehending the information, relating the information to prior knowledge of the subject matter, making inferences, and evaluating the information's usefulness to a report he or she is writing". It is essential to understand automaticity and how it is achieved to better a student's performance. This is important for teachers because automaticity should be focused on in the early years to ensure higher level reading skills in adolescence.

== Disruption ==
Automaticity can be disrupted by explicit attention when the devotion of conscious attention to the pattern alters the content or timing of that pattern itself. This phenomenon is especially pronounced in situations that feature high upside and/or downside risk and impose the associated psychological stress on one's conscious mind; one's performance in these situations may either a) be unimpaired or even enhanced ("flow") or b) deteriorate ("choke").

This effect has been named the "centipede effect" after the fable of the "Centipede's dilemma", where a toad immobilises a centipede simply by asking it how it walks. The centipede's normally unconscious locomotion was interrupted by conscious reflection on it. The psychologist George Humphrey referred to this parable in his 1923 The story of man's mind: "No man skilled at a trade needs to put his constant attention on the routine work," he wrote. "If he does, the job is apt to be spoiled."

== Use to influence ==
Small request	Sound reason	94% (15 out of 16)
Small request	No reason	60% (9 out of 15)
Small request	Placebic reason	93% (14 out of 15)
Large request	Sound reason	42% (10 out of 24)
Large request	No reason	24% (6 out of 25)
Large request	Placebic reason	24% (6 out of 25)

In Influence, Robert Cialdini's book about social psychology and influence tactics, Cialdini explains how common automatic response patterns are in human behavior, and how easily they can be triggered, even with erroneous cues. He describes an experiment conducted by social psychologists Langer, Chanowitz, and Blank which illustrates how compliant people will be with a request if they hear words that sound like they are being given a reason, even if no actual reason is provided. The experimenters approached people standing in line to use a photocopier with one of three requests:

- "Excuse me. I have 5 pages. May I use the Xerox machine because I'm in a rush?"
- "Excuse me. I have 5 pages. May I use the Xerox machine?"
- "Excuse me. I have 5 pages. May I use the Xerox machine because I have to make some copies?"

When given the request plus a reason, 94% of people asked complied with the request. When given the request without a reason, only 60% complied. But when given the request with what sounds like a reason but isn't, compliance jumped back to 93%. Langer, Chanowitz, and Blank are convinced that most human behavior falls into automatic response patterns.

However, when the request was made larger (20 pages instead of 5), subjects expected a sound reason before complying, as illustrated in the table.

== See also ==
- Habit (psychology)
- Habituation
- Neural adaptation
- Implicit memory
- Unconscious cognition
- Unconscious thought theory

== Sources ==
- PhysioEx 6.0 – Peter Zao – Timothy Stabler – Greta Peterson – Lori Smith
- Shiffrin, R.M.; Schneider, W. (1977). "Controlled and automatic human information processing. II. Perceptual learning, automatic attending and a general theory". Psychological Review. 84 (2): 127–190. doi:10.1037/0033-295x.84.2.127.
- Samuels, S. J.; Flor, R.F. (1997). "The Importance of Automaticity for Developing Expertise in Reading". Reading & Writing Quarterly. 13 (2): 107–121. doi:10.1080/1057356970130202.
- Cialdini, R.B. (2001). Influence: Science and practice (4th ed.). Boston: Allyn & Bacon. p. 4
