= Highway hypnosis =

Altered mental state while driving

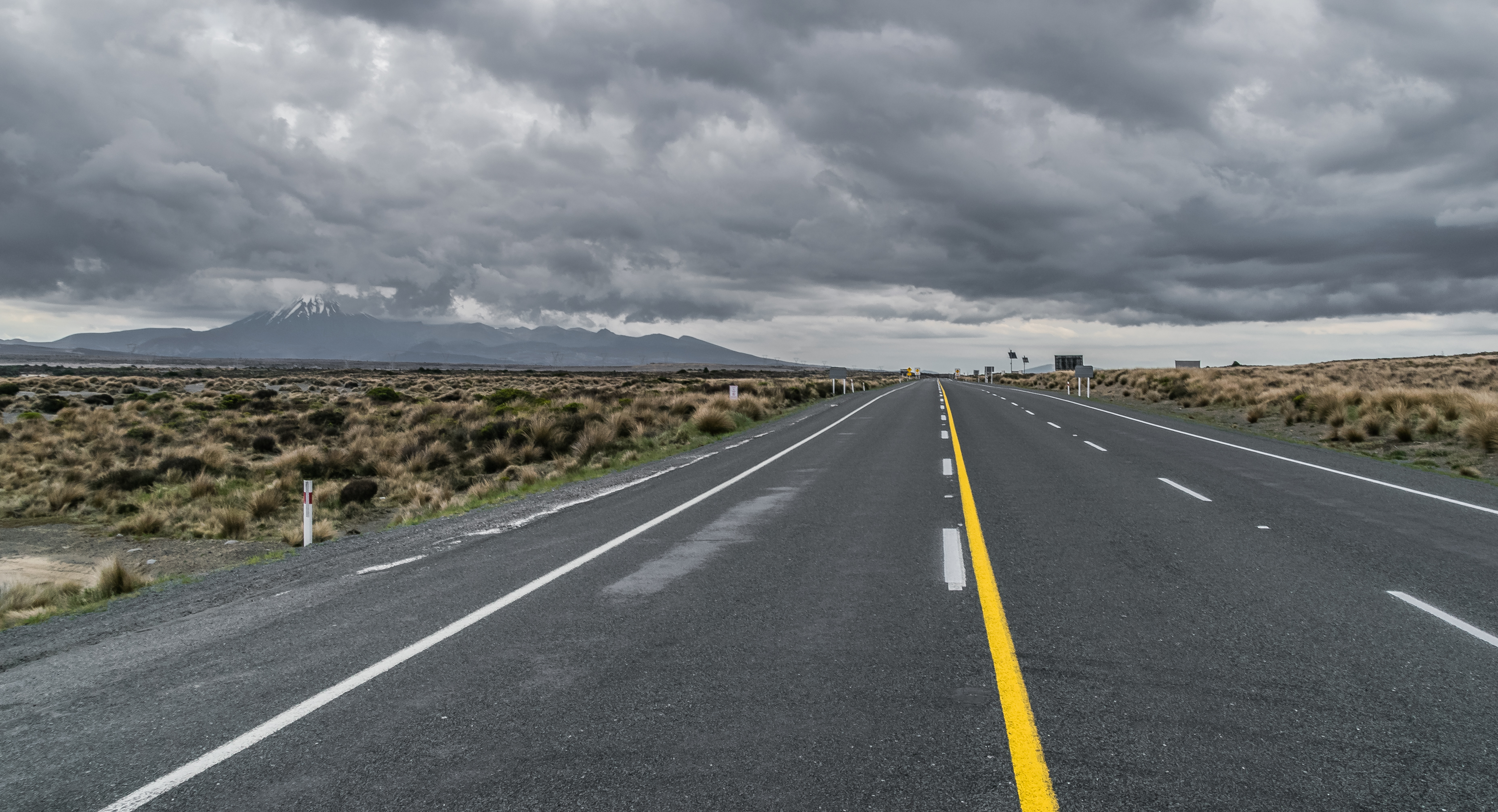
Open road in New Zealand

Highway hypnosis, also known as white line fever, is an altered mental state in which an automobile driver can drive adequately over long distances without consciously remembering having done so.

It appears that in this state, the driver's conscious attention is fully focused elsewhere, yet their brain is still able to process a significant amount of information related to the road and vehicle control on a subconscious level. Highway hypnosis is a manifestation of the common process of automaticity, the ability to perform complex actions without being consciously aware of the processes involved to do them. In some cases, the trance state in a driver can be so deep that auditory and visual distortions occur.

== History ==
The idea of a hypnotic trance while driving was first described in a 1921 article that mentioned the phenomenon of "road hypnotism": driving in a trance-like state while gazing at a fixed point. A 1929 study, Sleeping with the Eyes Open by Walter Miles, also addressed the subject, suggesting that motorists could fall asleep with their eyes open and continue to steer.

A highway near Steamboat Rock, Iowa.

The idea that this phenomenon could explain the unaccountable automobile accidents became popular in the 1950s. The term "highway hypnosis" was coined by G. W. Williams in 1963. Building on the theories of Ernest Hilgard (1986, 1992) that hypnosis is an altered state of awareness, some theorists hold that the consciousness can develop hypnotic dissociation. In highway hypnosis, one stream of consciousness drives the car while the other deals with other matters. Partial or complete amnesia related to the time spent driving under highway hypnosis can develop for the driver involved.

In contemporary international scientific literature, the term "highway hypnosis" is increasingly being replaced by "driving without attention mode" (DWAM).

== Causes ==
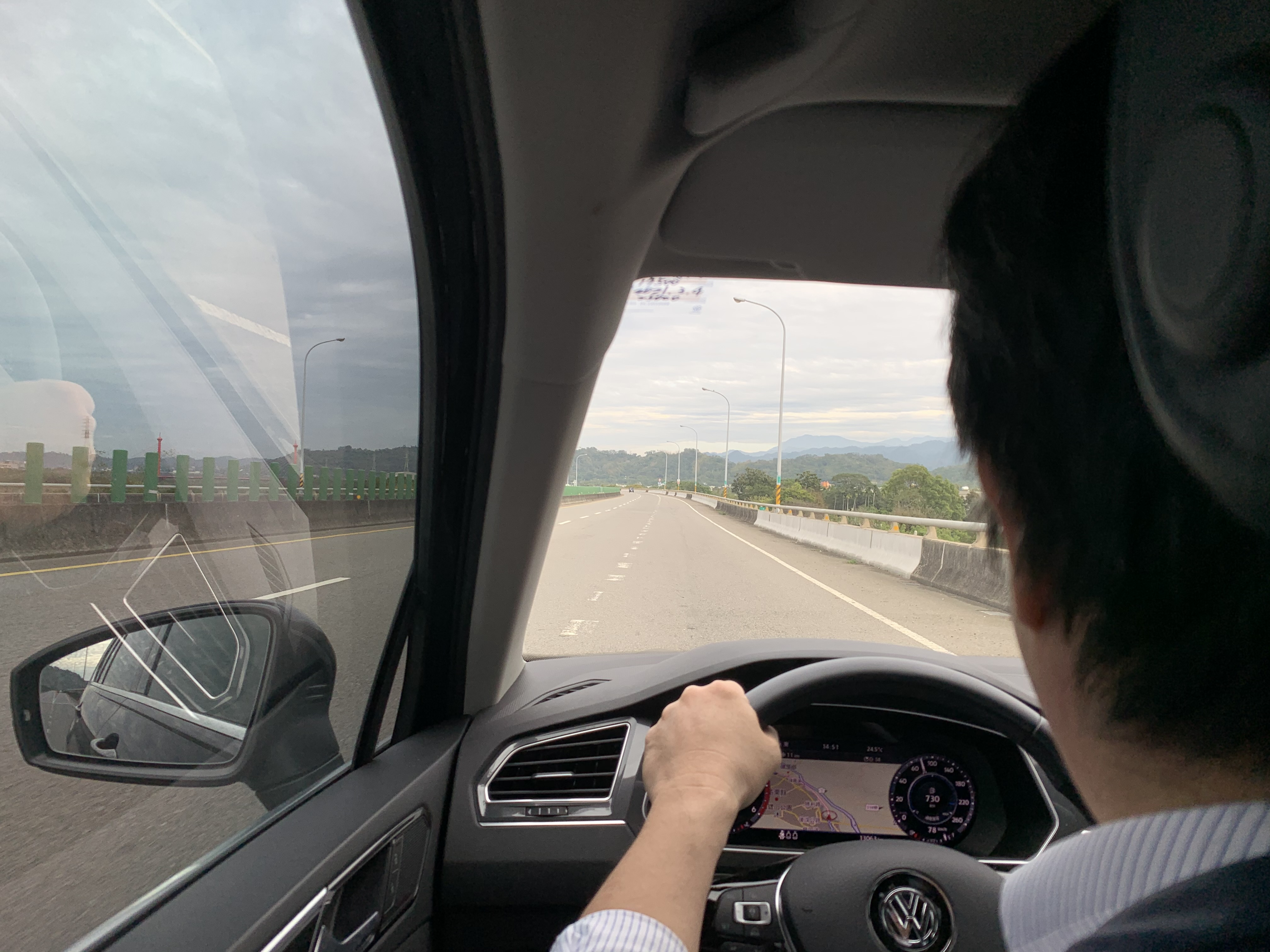
Monotonous scenery can be a factor in highway hypnosis

It is suggested that highway hypnosis can be triggered by the following factors:

- Monotonous scenery outside the window (i.e., the absence of variation in visual stimuli, "sensory deprivation")
- The flicker of white lane markings in front of the driver's eyes
- Light glare, reflections on the car's hood or wet road
- Monotonous engine noise and car swaying
- Driver fatigue
- Driving alone or with passengers who have fallen asleep (absence of distracting factors)
- A relaxed driver state or, conversely, severe stress, as well as problems occupying all the driver's attention
- The ability to drive without the need for intense concentration (e.g., on highways without intersections or traffic lights) or with few cars on the road

It is suggested that highway hypnosis occurs more frequently in experienced drivers and on familiar road sections, as opposed to newer drivers and on roads in unfamiliar areas.

Experimental studies have shown that highway hypnosis is less likely due to monotonous landscape and uniformity of the road than to predictability of the situation for the driver. For example, if a driver has to drive in the day on a curvy road, but they have previously driven on this road many times in dark, highway hypnosis is more likely to occur.

== Associated risks ==
Highway hypnosis is considered a serious risk factor for traffic accidents.

Although a driver in a state of highway hypnosis can drive a car, they cannot react quickly and adequately to unexpected road situations. In this state, there is a tendency for the driver to gradually increase speed (a phenomenon known as psychological inertia of speed).

Highway hypnosis is also considered a symptom of severe driver fatigue and may be the first stage of falling asleep at the wheel. In this case, the driver may not be aware of their fatigue or that they are falling asleep.

== External signs ==
Thanks to experimental research on the phenomenon of highway hypnosis, external signs of a trance state in a driver have been identified:

- Driver stares intently at the road, with their head tilted forward, or the driver suddenly makes a sudden, jerking head movement.
- Driver's eyes roll back.
- Driver's eyes are half-closed or squinting.
- Driver makes driving errors.

== Prevention methods ==
It has been established that highway hypnosis occurs more frequently on highways with high-quality pavement, especially if there are no sharp curves. Therefore, the following technical measures are sometimes taken to increase driver alertness: alternating between smooth asphalt and coarse gravel pavement, creating noticeable vibrations, and placing unexpected turns on straight, monotonous sections of the road.

It is suggested that highway hypnosis arises due to monotonous scenery or the "flicker" of light glare and white lane markings, so drivers are advised to periodically change their gaze direction (e.g., look in the side mirrors or at the dashboard instruments). Since one of the causes of highway hypnosis is sensory deprivation (monotonous, uninteresting scenery), it can be useful to place bright and unusual decorative objects along the highway.

Highway hypnosis is often a precursor to falling asleep at the wheel, so at the first signs of drowsiness, the driver is advised to stop the car and rest or do light physical exercises. It is also recommended to take breaks every three hours of monotonous driving, even if the driver does not feel tired.

To increase driver attention, passengers are advised to engage the driver in conversation. If the driver is alone, they are advised to talk to themselves out loud or hum. In Queensland, Australia signs have been installed with trivia questions and answers in order to help drivers to break up the monotony of long drives

It is also believed that chewing (gum, dried fruit, etc.) slightly reduces the risk of highway hypnosis.

== See also ==
- Automaticity – Ability to do things without occupying the mind with the low-level details required
- Automatism (law) – Legal defence based on lack of awareness of actions
- Flow (psychology) – Full immersion in an activity
- Muscle memory – Consolidating a motor task into memory through repetition
- Microsleep – Temporary episode of sleep or drowsiness
- Selective hearing – Selective attention involving the auditory system
- Sleep-deprived driving – Operating a motor vehicle while cognitively impaired by lack of sleep
- Sleep driving – Sleeping phenomenon combined with wakefulness
- Inattentional blindness – Condition of failing to see something in plain view
