= Wilson Bryan Key =

American writer (1925–2008)

- Born: January 31, 1925
- Died: October 8, 2008 (aged 83)
- Education: University of Denver
- Writing career
- Subjects: Media theory, propaganda

Wilson Bryan Key (January 31, 1925 – October 8, 2008) was an American writer. He was the author of several books about subliminal messages and subliminal advertising.

== Career ==
Key obtained his doctorate in communications from the University of Denver and taught journalism for a short period of time at the University of Western Ontario. He was a colleague and friend of Marshall McLuhan.

A US court case in 1990 accused the English Heavy Metal Band Judas Priest of causing suicide through subliminal messaging. Key advised the plaintiff's lawyer to hire Bill Nickloff, an audio engineer, to find the subliminal messaging. The judge found that the defendant was not responsible for the deaths.

== Death ==
Key died following complications resulting from surgery. He is interred at the Northern Nevada Veterans Memorial Cemetery in Fernley, Nevada.

== Criticism ==
His results and conclusions have been challenged, in books including the following:

- Boese, Alex (2006). Hippo Eats Dwarf: A Field Guide to Hoaxes and Other B.S.. Harcourt, Inc. ISBN 0156030837.
- Moore, Timothy E. (Spring 1992). "Subliminal Perception: Facts and Fallacies". Skeptical Inquirer. 16 (3): 273–281. Reprinted in Encounters with the Paranormal: Science, Knowledge, and Belief, edited by Kendrick Frazier, Prometheus Books, 1998, 253–263. ISBN 157392203X
- Pratkanis, Anthony R. (Spring 1992). "Myths of Subliminal Persuasion: The Cargo-cult Science of Subliminal Persuasion". Skeptical Inquirer. 16 (3): 260–272. Reprinted in Encounters with the Paranormal: Science, Knowledge, and Belief, edited by Kendrick Frazier, Prometheus Books, 1998, 240–252. ISBN 157392203X

== Bibliography ==
- Subliminal Seduction: Are You Being Sexually Aroused By This Picture? a.k.a. Ad Media's Manipulation of a Not So Innocent America (1974). Introduction by Marshall McLuhan. Prentice-Hall, Inc. Library of Congress Catalog Card Number: LCCN 73--5421.
- Media Sexploitation (1976). Prentice-Hall, Inc. ISBN 978-0135730065
- The Clam-Plate Orgy: And Other Subliminal Techniques for Manipulating Your Behavior (1980). Signet.
  - reissued as Subliminal Ad-Ventures in Erotic Art (1992). Branden Books. ISBN 0828319510
- The Age of Manipulation: The Con in Confidence, The Sin in Sincere (1989). H. Holt. ISBN 978-0819186539

== See also ==
- Programming the Nation?
