= Ap Dijksterhuis =

Dutch social scientist (born 1968)

Albert Jan "Ap" Dijksterhuis (born 12 November 1968, Zutphen) received his Ph.D. in social sciences from Radboud University Nijmegen in 1996. His adviser was Ad van Knippenberg. From 1996-1999, he did post-doc work as a research fellow of the Royal Dutch Academy of Arts and Sciences, located in Amsterdam. In 2000, he became a professor at the University of Amsterdam, returning to Radboud University Nijmegen in 2006 where he stayed until 2025. In 2007, his first book was published, in Dutch, called 'Het slimme onbewuste' ('The Smart Unconscious').

== Awards ==
- 2005- Award for Distinguished Scientific Early Career Contributions to Psychology - APA
- 2005- Kurt Lewin Medal - EASP
- 2007- Wegner Theoretical Innovation Prize - SPSP

== Research ==
His areas of research have varied, but all deal with unconscious: the perception-behavior link, goals, Implicit Self Esteem Issues, and unconscious thought. His theory that certain behaviour can be modified by unconscious cues is somewhat controversial.

=== Perception-Behavior link (1995–2001) ===
Bargh, Chen, and Burrows showed a relationship between activation of traits and behavior. In one of the experiments they primed participants with words related to the elderly and found they walked slower leaving the experiment than controls. Dijksterhuis started investigating the link between perception and behavior, but instead of direct behavior he wanted to measure ability. Over multiple studies, Dijksterhuis and van Knippenberg primed subjects with the stereotype of professor (thought of as intelligent), and the stereotype of soccer hooligans (thought of as stupid). In the last study, they also primed them directly with intelligent or stupid, rather than just using a stereotype. In a supposedly unrelated task, they used a general knowledge measure to test for effects of the priming. In all of the studies, participants primed with intelligence, by stereotype or directly, did better than controls. The opposite is true for those primed with stupidity. The duration of priming (9 minutes vs 2 minutes) affected performance with those in the long condition performing better than those in the short condition.

These results have been called into question due to failure of multiple researchers to replicate.

=== Implicit self-esteem (2000–present) ===
Much work has been done on measuring self-esteem. More recently, there has been a focus on implicit self-esteem, and how to measure it. According to Bosson, Swann, and Pennebaker there is little to no correlation between several previously used implicit self-esteem measures. The same results were found when comparing implicit and explicit measures. Dijksterhuis acknowledges this limitation and tries to work around it by manipulating implicit self-esteem then measuring it with the name-letter effect or self-esteem IAT. In the experiments, he uses evaluative conditioning to enhance implicit self-esteem subconsciously. The word 'I' was subliminally presented (15 milliseconds) followed by either positive traits (e.g. smart) or neutral words (e.g. chair), depending on the condition. Evaluative conditioning is most often used to change attitude towards a neutral stimuli, but he proposed it would work for implicit self-esteem. The results support his hypothesis; participants in the experimental condition showed higher levels of implicit self-esteem on both measures compared to controls.

Greenwald and Banaji's definition of implicit self-esteem is: "implicit self-esteem is the introspectively unidentified (or inaccurately identified) effect of the self-attitude on evaluation of self-associated and self-dissociated objects". Dijksterhuis proposes an alternate definition that self-esteem is the attitude and that the evaluation of objects is a consequence of this attitude. He also proposes that the different measures have not correlated with each other because they are either measuring the attitude towards self or the consequence of this attitude.

=== Unconscious Thought Theory (UTT) (2002–present) ===
Unconscious thought theory (UTT) was introduced by Dijksterhuis in 2004. He presented 5 experiments showing that people make better decisions when they thought about it unconsciously rather than consciously. The argument is that conscious thought is not capable of handling all the complex information that we need to process in order to make good decisions. In experiment 2 participants in the conscious thought condition reported only using a subset of the information provided to make their decision.

In a 2006 paper, Dijksterhuis and colleagues did multiple studies looking at making the best choices. In the first study, participants were shown 4 (simple) or 12 (complex) attributes, randomized one at a time, about four fake cars. The attributes were either positive or negative. Two of the cars had equal numbers of positive and negative attributes, one was presented with 75% positive attributes, and the other 25%. After the attributes were shown participants were told they would have to pick the best car. Half the participants were allowed to think about the cars for 4 minutes (conscious thought condition) the other half were distracted for those 4 minutes solving anagrams (unconscious thought condition). After the 4 minutes everyone chose the best car and participants in the simple condition made better decisions in the conscious thought condition, but unconscious thought led to better decisions in the complex condition. Other studies are presented in the article applying this same design to the real world decisions (e.g. department store vs a furniture store).

Dijksterhuis wanted to get away from the artificial information that people are provided in a laboratory setting and see what happens when they have to rely on their own knowledge about a subject to make decisions. Dijksterhuis and colleagues designed an experiment where subjects had to rate their level of expertise on soccer, then pick win, lose, or draw for four upcoming soccer matches in the Dutch league. Participants were placed in one of the following conditions: choose within 20 seconds of seeing the matches, given two minutes to deliberate (conscious), or distracted for two minutes (unconscious), then asked to choose. Results show that nonexperts do about as well in all conditions but experts perform better in the unconscious thought condition. They replicated the study using World Cup matches since there is a more objective way to measure expertise with national team world ranking rather than asking participants to self-report expertise. The pattern of results was similar to the first study.
