= Victoria Plaut =

Victoria C. Plaut
- Born: c. 1974 (age 51–52)
- Education: Harvard University; London School of Economics; Stanford University
- Scientific career
- Fields: Social psychology
- Thesis: Sociocultural Models of Diversity : the Dilemma of Difference in America (2002)
- Doctoral advisor: Hazel Rose Markus

Victoria Caroline Plaut (born c. 1974) is a professor of law and social science at the University of California, Berkeley, where she studies the challenges and opportunities of multiculturalism and diversity. Her pioneering work has examined barriers faced by women in computer science, Whites' reactions to multiculturalism, and the myth of colorblindness in organizations. A noted expert on the causes and consequences of implicit bias, she has penned articles for venues such as the New York Times, the Chicago Tribune, and Scientific American; and served as an amicus curae to the U.S. Supreme Court.

Plaut received her undergraduate degree from Harvard University, her master's in social psychology from the London School of Economics, and her doctorate in social and cultural psychology from Stanford University's Department of Psychology.
