= James Vicary =

American market researcher (1915–1977)

James McDonald Vicary (April 30, 1915 – November 7, 1977) was an American market researcher who pioneered the concept of subliminal advertising with an experiment in 1956, later determined to have been fraudulent. Vicary was unable to ever reproduce the results of his experiments. In 1962, Vicary finally admitted that his subliminal "experiment" had been concocted as a gimmick to attract customers to his failing marketing business.

== Biography ==
Vicary was born in Detroit in 1915 and trained at the University of Michigan (A.B. 1940), where he acted as head of the Bureau of Student Opinion and conducted an extensive survey that tracked and ranked words with negative associations. He also later studied the phenomena of word association in advertising and published his research in the Harvard Business Review in 1948.

After graduating in 1940 and registering as a conscientious objector during World War II, Vicary worked for Crowell-Collier Publishing and then Benton and Bowles before founding his own market research company in New York, the James M. Vicary Company. He pioneered the use of eye-blink analysis to obtain clues about subjects' levels of emotional tension when exposed to various stimuli. Vicary's papers are held by the Thomas J. Dodd Research Center at the University of Connecticut in Storrs.

As a child, Vicary was known to have a fascination with snakes, and was called Detroit's youngest snake charmer by The Detroit News.

== Subliminal Advertising Experiment ==
=== The Experiment ===
One of the most commonly known examples of subliminal messaging is Vicary's alleged movie theater experiment during 1956 in Fort Lee, New Jersey. At a press conference in September 1957, he claimed that 45,699 people were exposed to 1/3,000-second subliminal projections telling them to "Eat Popcorn" and "Drink Coca-Cola", causing a 57.5 percent sales increase for popcorn and an 18.1 percent increase in Coca-Cola sales.

When challenged later to replicate the study, Vicary failed to produce significant results. He provided no explanations for his results or any other details about his study to the public, claiming that it was part of a confidential patent. When Stuart Rogers interviewed people from the theater that supposedly conducted this experiment, the manager declared that no such test was ever done (Rogers 1992) In a television interview with Fred Danzig in 1962 for Advertising Age, Vicary admitted that the original study was "a gimmick" and that the amount of data was "too small to be meaningful." He shied away from media attention after the disclosure. Numerous commentaries have appeared on this affair since 1957.

=== Public Response ===
Based on Vicary's claims, the CIA produced a report, "The Operational Potential of Subliminal Perception" in 1958, which suggested that "Certain individuals can at certain times and under certain circumstances be influenced to act abnormally without awareness of the influence." After receiving complaints that some television stations had broadcast a subliminal advertisement, the Federal Communications Commission (FCC) issued a policy statement in 1974 declaring subliminal advertising techniques as "contrary to the public interest."

== Publications ==
- "How Psychiatric Methods Can be Applied to Market Research", Printers' Ink, v. 235, no. 6, May 11, 1951, pp. 39–48.
- "Seasonal Psychology", Journal of Marketing, April 1956
- "The Circular Test of Bias in Personal Interview Surveys." Public Opinion Quarterly 19, no. 2, Summer 1955 215-218

== See also ==
- Programming the Nation?
