= Unconscious cognition =

Mental processing without awareness

Unconscious cognition is the processing of perception, memory, learning, thought, and language without being aware of it.

The role of the unconscious mind on decision making is a topic greatly debated by neuroscientists, linguists, philosophers, and psychologists around the world. Though the actual level of involvement of the unconscious brain during a cognitive process might still be a matter of differential opinion, the fact that the unconscious brain does play a role in cognitive activity is undeniable. Several experiments and well recorded phenomena attest to this fact, for example the illusion-of-truth effect. There have also been several experiments suggesting that the unconscious mind might actually be better at decision making than the conscious mind when there are multiple variables to take into consideration.

== History ==
The attitude of the scientific community towards the unconscious mind has undergone a drastic change from being viewed as a lazy reservoir of memories and non-task oriented behavior to being regarded as an active and essential component in the processes of decision making.

Historically, the unconscious mind has been viewed as the source of dreams, implicit memory (which allows people to walk or ride a bicycle without consciously thinking about the activity), and the storing place for memories. But new insight revealing that the unconscious brain might also be an active player in decision making, problem solving, creative writing and critical thinking have revolutionized the predominant view of the importance of the unconscious on cognitive processes. One familiar example of the operation of the unconscious in problem solving is a well-known phenomenon of having a "Eureka!" moment when a solution to a problem in the past presents itself without the involvement of active thinking.

Currently, several experiments are being performed to measure the extent of unconscious' influence on conscious thought.

== Types of unconscious ==
=== Freud's unconscious ===
Sigmund Freud is perhaps the most well-known psychologist and his theories laid the foundation for the serious scientific investigation of the unconscious brain. Consciousness, according to Freud, was the center for perception whereas the unconscious was the storehouse of memories, desires, and needs. According to Freud past thoughts and memories which are deleted from conscious thought are stored by the unconscious and these thoughts help direct the thoughts and feelings of an individual and influence their decision-making processes. Freud believed that the Unconscious' influence on thoughts can be accessed by training one's mind through meditation, or by random association, dream analysis and paying attention to Freudian slips.

=== Jung's unconscious ===
Carl Jung further expounded Freud's view of the unconscious and categorized the unconscious into the personal unconscious and the collective unconscious. He believed that the personal unconscious held memories and experiences specific to every individual and the collective unconscious held memories, predispositions and experiences of a species which are passed on from generation to generation and are shared among all the individuals of a species.

=== Lacan's linguistic unconscious ===
Jacques Lacan in his psychoanalytical theory compared the structuring of the unconscious to the way a language is structured. According to his theory there is no reference to self thus making the unconscious a dynamic structure. This suggests that unconscious influence on thought processes could be altered after traumatic brain injury. This theory could explain the cases of altered personality, like Phineas Gage, due to trauma or traumatic brain injury.

== Measurement ==
To establish unconscious perception a demonstration of the absence of some critical stimulus is established and the effect of the same stimulus on behavior is tested. To establish the absence of the stimulus, the degree to which a critical stimulus reaches conscious awareness is assessed, by testing whether a subject can acknowledge or perceive the presence of the stimulus. This is called a direct measure (D) of processing, as the task requires some type of direct report on the perception of the critical stimulus from the subject. Also, one must assess the degree to which the stimulus affects a certain behavior. This process is the indirect measure (I) as responses of something other than the critical stimulus is measured.

These measurements are associated to the dissociation logic, a foundational assumption that has dictated research into unconscious cognition for over a century now, according to which a cognitive phenomenon is strictly either conscious or unconscious. In fact, it has now the status of a scientific paradigm, but criticism has started to fall upon it, with calls for a paradigm shift in the field.

== Effects of the unconscious during data gathering ==
It has been well established that the unconscious plays a vital role in perception and data analysis. The numerous examples of optical illusions, hallucinations and other tricks that the unconscious brain plays on the conscious brain provide ample evidence of the active role of the unconscious mind during data gathering and analysis. Several experiments have been performed to show that the unconscious brain is able to gather data at a much faster rate than the conscious brain and also that the unconscious brain filters out a great amount of information and can use this information to influence cognitive decision-making processes.

=== Artificially induced scotomas ===
Vilayanur S. Ramachandran in his research proved that the unconscious brain not only screens certain data from the conscious brain, rendering visual data inaccurate, but also is responsible for filling in false data in place of missing data in certain circumstances. In his paper on "Perceptual filling in of artificially induced scotomas in human vision" he records the effect of the unconscious brain filling in the blind spots in the human visual field.

=== Subliminal messages ===
Subliminal messages also use the phenomenon of the unconscious brain processing messages faster than the conscious brain and also noticing data in a visual or auditory field that remain below the threshold of the conscious brain. They come in various forms, e.g., a quick clip inserted within another video or barely perceptible text inscribed in a picture. These messages flutter on the edge of perception and are almost impossible to notice unless and until one's conscious brain is called to pay attention to these minute details. Modern day ads, posters and even shows and movies which are broadcast around the world use subliminal messages to unconsciously attract an individual or manipulate an individual to unconsciously like a product or a show.

== Effect on learning, thinking and decision making ==
=== Artificial grammar learning ===
Studies that test the way in which humans acquire language skills and learn how to apply the rules of grammar show that a large amount of language and grammar learning takes place unconsciously. Experiments were performed in which participants were asked to identify whether certain nonsensical and made up words belong to a group of words which they had been previously shown. Some participants were not informed that the word sets were based on rules. An analysis of their responses showed that the participants were more likely to associate words which were not shown previously as a part of the group if they followed the preset grammatical rules. This shows that it might not be necessary to be consciously aware of grammatical rules to know proper grammar. This theory might explain the feeling we undergo when we feel that a certain sentence structure is awkward or wrong even though we might not be able to clearly define the reason why the sentence is incorrect.

=== Implicit egotism ===
Implicit egotism refers to the unconscious tendency of people to prefer things that resemble the self. In studies performed to test the effect of implicit egotism it has been shown that implicit egotism does in fact play a significant role in processes that influence major life decisions. Studies show that inexplicably people choose partners whose name is phonetically or structurally similar to their own names. This effect of implicit egotism is not only limited to relationship decisions but can also be seen in decisions regarding place or city of residence and arguable in almost every other aspects of life.

=== Unconscious association ===
The unconscious mind's tendency to make associations can have a significant effect on decision-making processes. For example, we generally associate a green traffic light as a sign to keep proceeding while we associate a red traffic light as a sign to come to a halt. If in an experimental setting a person attuned to these associations was asked to come to a halt when shown a green light and keep moving when shown a red light, the individual would have to make a conscious effort to follow these new set of rules. The associations of the unconscious mind lead to the creation of implicit attitudes. An implicit attitude manifests itself as an action or judgment that is under the control of automatically activated evaluation, without the performer's awareness of that causation. Implicit attitudes can have a profound effect on decision making when automatic implicit associations are made in socially significant ways. Based on unconscious racial prejudice, sexist attitudes and nepotism might have a huge bearing in the real world as one might unconsciously show favoritism due to implicit attitudes.

== Unconscious thought theory ==
Experiments were performed to measure the decision making prowess of the unconscious mind and they showed that when there are multiple variables to be considered in a given decision making situation, the unconscious mind can actually be a better decision maker than the conscious mind.

Ap Dijksterhuis in his experiments to measure the effectiveness of the unconscious brain in its decision-making abilities performed 3 experiments that involved choosing or evaluating different alternatives based on positive and negative attributes. Participants were divided in 3 groups and different groups were allowed come to a conclusion about the alternatives in different ways. The first group was asked to come up with instantaneous evaluations, the second group was asked to come up with an evaluation after careful consideration (consciously) and the third group was asked to come with an evaluation after a period of time in which they were distracted by another task, which occupied their consciousness, unconsciously. It was proven in all three experiments that the group which was allowed to think about the different alternatives unconsciously stumbled upon the right evaluations and picked the alternatives with the most positive attributes more often than the other 2 groups.

== The "radical plasticity" thesis ==
Axel Cleeremans, a professor of cognitive science with the Department of Psychology of the Université Libre de Bruxelles, Brussels, in his paper "The radical plasticity thesis: how the brain learns to be conscious", proposed the idea that conscious brain is a product of unconscious brain's attempts at predicting the consequences of its actions on the external world. The paper also states that the activity of one cerebral region and its effect on the other regions of the brain. According to "radical plasticity" thesis, thinking and reasoning are the products of the unconscious mind's ability to decipher and process countless possibilities and predict the consequences of taking a certain course of action. In contrast, the conscious mind is only able to process the outcomes of no more than a couple of courses of action during decision making.

The brain unconsciously learns to re-describe its own activity to itself in terms of possibilities and probabilities and generates a method to allow activate certain parts of its anatomy to help engender the most profitable outcome. These learned re-descriptions, enriched by the emotional value associated with them, form the basis of conscious experience.

== See also ==
- Pre-attentive processing
- Implicit learning
- Response priming
- Subliminal stimuli
- Unconscious thought theory § Criticism of UTT
