= Subliminal stimuli =

Sensory stimuli below an individual's threshold for conscious perception

Subliminal stimuli (/sʌbˈlɪmɪnəl/; sub- literally "below" or "less than") are any sensory stimuli below an individual's threshold or limit for conscious perception, in contrast to supraliminal stimuli (above threshold). Visual stimuli may be quickly flashed before an individual can process them, or flashed and then masked to interrupt processing. Audio stimuli may be played below audible volumes or masked by other stimuli.

In 1957, the American cinematographer James Vicary claimed to have increased the sales of Coca-Cola by inserting in his cinema's movies some frames with "Drink Coca-Cola!" written on it. Five years later, however, he admitted to having inflated his results somewhat by including certain data that were labeled scientifically unreliable. However, Vicary's claim increased scientific interest in subliminal messages.

Subliminal stimulation is now accepted as a legitimate research field in the scientific literature. A 2012 review of functional magnetic resonance imaging (fMRI) studies showed that subliminal stimuli activate specific regions of the brain despite participants' unawareness, a result corroborated in a meta-analysis from 2023 concerning subliminal stimulation in post-traumatic stress disorder (PTSD).

== Effectiveness ==
Applications of subliminal stimuli are often based on the persuasiveness of a message. Research on action priming has shown that subliminal stimuli can only trigger actions a receiver of the message plans to perform anyway. However, consensus of subliminal messaging remains unsubstantiated by other research. Most actions can be triggered subliminally only if the person is already prepared to perform a specific action.

The context that the stimulus is presented in affects their effectiveness. For example, if the target is thirsty then a subliminal stimulus for a drink is likely to influence the target to purchase that drink if it is readily available. The stimuli can also influence the target to choose the primed option over other habitually chosen options. If the subliminal stimuli are for a product that is not quickly accessible or if there is no need for it within a specific context then the stimuli will have little to no effect. Subliminal priming can direct people's actions even when they believe they are making free choices. When primed to push a button with their off-hand, people will use that hand even if they are given a free choice between using their off-hand and their dominant hand. However, a meta analysis of many strong articles displaying effectiveness of subliminal messaging revealed its effects on actual consumer purchasing choices between two alternatives are not statistically significant; subliminal messaging is only effective in behaviour in very specific present intentions and contexts, which means they do not have visible results for mischievous use. It is suggested, however, that subliminal stimuli can bias acting decisions, including internally and freely generated ones, but, since that effect remains along with the aforementioned intentions and contexts, any impact on the choice of action are not mischievous but rather appropriate and adaptive.

== Method ==
In subliminal stimuli research, the threshold is the level at which the participant is not aware of the stimulus being presented. Researchers determine a threshold for the stimulus that is used as the subliminal stimulus. That stimulus is then presented during the study at some point and measures are taken to determine the effects of the stimulus. The way in which studies operationally define thresholds depends on the methods of the particular article. The methodology of the research also varies by the type of subliminal stimulus (auditory or visual) and the dependent variables they measure.

=== Objective threshold ===
The objective threshold is found using a forced-choice procedure, in which participants must choose which stimulus they saw from options given to them. For example, participants are flashed a stimulus (like the word orange) and then given a few choices and asked which one they saw. Participants must choose an answer in this design—the objective threshold is obtained when participants' results in this task reach the level of (i.e. are no better than) that predicted by chance. The length of presentation that causes chance performance on the forced-choice task is used later in the study for the subliminal stimuli.

=== Subjective threshold ===
The subjective threshold is determined when the participant reports that their performance on the forced-choice procedure approximates chance. The subjective threshold is 30 to 50 ms slower than the objective threshold, demonstrating that participants' ability to detect the stimuli is earlier than their perceived accuracy ratings would indicate; that is, stimuli presented at a subjective threshold have a longer presentation time than those presented at an objective threshold. When using the objective threshold, priming stimuli neither facilitated nor inhibited the recognition of a color. However, the longer the duration of the priming stimulus, the greater effect it had on subsequent responding. These findings indicate that the results of some studies may be due to their definition of below threshold.

=== Emotional threshold ===
Some stimuli supposed to elicit a specific emotional reaction (e.g., spider pictures shown to a spider-fearful person) could fail to elicit it even if consciously perceived. This sounds apparently obvious: even if one is arachnophobic, the spider picture could be too brief to elicit a fear reaction. However, this is not obvious at all from the perspective of a phobic person, who is typically afraid even by the mere thought of the phobic stimulus. This lack of emotional response induced by very brief phobic pictures that were nonetheless emerged to awareness has brought to the definition and empirical demonstration of emotionally-subliminal stimuli as stimuli that do not induce the expected emotional reaction even if consciously perceived.

=== Direct and indirect measures ===
Perception without awareness can be demonstrated through the comparison of direct and indirect measures of perception. Direct measures use responses to task definitions in accordance to the explicit instructions given to the subjects, while indirect measures use responses that are not a part of the task definition given to subjects. Both direct and indirect measures are displayed under comparable conditions except for the direct or indirect instruction. For example, in a typical Stroop test, subjects are asked to name the color of a patch of ink. A direct measure is accuracy—true to the instructions given to the participants. The popular indirect measure used in the same task is response time—subjects are not told that they are being measured for response times.

Similarly, a direct effect is the effect of a task stimulus on the instructed response to it, and is usually measured as accuracy. An indirect effect is an uninstructed effect of the task stimulus on behavior, sometimes measured by including an irrelevant or distracting component in the task stimulus and measuring its effect on accuracy. These effects are then compared on their relative sensitivity: an indirect effect that is greater than a direct effect indicates that unconscious cognition exists.

However, a debate was raised in the scientific literature because of the heterogeneity of paradigms to make stimuli subliminal and to assess their effectiveness: the best solution has been proposed to be a trial-by-trial assessment of each stimulus' conscious detection. Despite its rigorousness, this assessment can be problematic in studies comparing the brain responses to detected versus undetected stimuli, as the resulting differences could be attributed to the act of answering (e.g., pressing a button) rather than to the (un)conscious processing: in these cases, a no-report paradigm could be preferable.

== Visual stimuli ==
In order to study the effects of subliminal stimuli, researchers often prime participants with specific visual stimuli, and determine if those stimuli elicit different responses. Subliminal stimuli have mostly been studied in the context of emotion; in particular, researchers have focused a lot of attention to the face perception and how subliminal presentation to different facial expression affects emotion. Visual subliminal stimuli have also been used to study emotion eliciting stimuli and simple geometric stimuli. A significant amount of research has been produced throughout the years to demonstrate the effects of subliminal visual stimuli.

=== Images ===
Attitudes can develop without being aware of their antecedents. Individuals viewed slides of people performing familiar daily activities after being exposed to either an emotionally positive scene, such as a romantic couple or kittens, or an emotionally negative scene, such as a werewolf or a dead body between each slide and the next. After exposure from something which the individuals consciously perceived as a flash of light, the participants exhibited more positive personality traits to those people whose slides were associated with an emotionally positive scene and vice versa. Despite the statistical difference, the subliminal messages had less of an impact on judgment than the slide's inherent level of physical attractiveness.

Individuals show right amygdala activity in response to subliminal fear, and a greater left amygdala response to supraliminal fear. In a 2005 study, participants were exposed to a subliminal image flashed for 16.7 milliseconds that could signal a potential threat and again with a supraliminal image flashed for half a second. Furthermore, supraliminal fear showed more sustained cortical activity, suggesting that subliminal fear may not entail conscious surveillance while supraliminal fear entails higher-order processing.

=== Emotion eliciting stimuli ===
A seminal article published in 1994 found that subliminal phobic pictures elicited specific electrodermal reactions even if not consciously perceived. This study paved the way for further research on the psychophysiological and behavioral correlates of emotionally-relevant stimuli made subliminal.

A subliminal sexual stimulus has a different effect on men compared to women. In a study by Omri Gilliath et al., men and women were subliminally exposed to either a sexual or a neutral picture, and their sexual arousal was recorded. Researchers examined the accessibility of sex-related thoughts after following the same procedure with either a pictorial judgment task or lexical decision task. The results revealed that the subliminal sexual stimuli did not have an effect on men, but for women, lower levels of sexual arousal were reported. However, in conditions related to accessibility of sex-related thoughts, the subliminal sexual stimuli led to higher accessibility for both men and women.

Subliminal stimuli can elicit significant emotional changes, but these changes are not valuable for a therapeutic effect. This has been proposed to be caused by a little influence of subliminal stimuli on the cognitive circuits that – together with survival ones – contribute to the conscious experience of fear. Spider-fearful and non-fearful undergraduates experienced either a positive, negative, or neutral subliminal priming stimulus followed immediately by a picture of a spider or a snake. Using visual analogue scales, the participants rated the affective quality of the picture. No evidence was found to support that the unpleasantness of the pictures can be modulated by subliminal priming. Non-fearful participants rated the spiders as being more frightening after being primed with a negative stimulus, but the event was not found in fearful participants. However, a systematic review of the literature found that the majority of negative results concerning subliminal phobic stimulations could be explained by a methodological issue (i.e., latency and duration of the subliminal stimulus) rather than by a real inefficacy of these pictures. Indeed, two meta-analyses of the scientific literature found significant – even if weak – results for both behavioral and brain imaging correlates of subliminal stimulation in panic disorder and post-traumatic stress disorder respectively.

=== Simple geometric stimuli ===
Laboratory research on unconscious perception often employs simple stimuli (e.g., geometric shapes or colors) in which visibility is controlled by visual masking. Masked stimuli are then used to prime the processing of subsequently presented target stimuli. For instance, in the response priming paradigm, participants have to respond to a target stimulus (e.g. by identifying whether it is a diamond or a square) which is immediately preceded by a masked priming stimulus (also a diamond or a square). The prime has large effects on responses to the target: it speeds responses when it is consistent with the target, and slows responses when it is inconsistent. Response priming effects can be dissociated from visual awareness of the prime, such as when prime identification performance is at chance, or when priming effects increase despite decreases in prime visibility.

The presentation of geometric figures as subliminal stimuli can result in below threshold discriminations. The geometric figures were presented on slides of a tachistoscope followed by a supraliminal shock for a given slide every time it appeared. The shock was administered after a five-second interval. Electrical skin changes of the participants that occurred before the reinforcement (shock) or non-reinforcement were recorded. The findings indicate that the proportion of electrical skin changes that occurred following subliminal visual stimuli was significantly greater than expected, while the proportion of electrical skin changes that occurred in response to the stimuli which were not reinforced was significantly less. As a whole, participants were able to make below threshold discriminations.

=== Word and non-word stimuli ===
Another form of visual stimuli is words and non-words. In a set of experiments, words and non-words were used as subliminal primes. Priming stimuli that work best as subliminal stimuli are words that have been classified several times before they are used to prime. Word primes can also be made from parts of practiced words to create new words. In this case, the actual word used to prime can have the opposite meaning of the words it came from (its "parents"), but it will still prime for the meaning of the parent words. Non-words created from previously practiced stimuli have a similar effect, even when they are unpronounceable (e.g. made of all consonants). These primes generally only increase response times for later stimuli for a very short period of time (milliseconds).

=== Masking visual stimuli ===
Visual stimuli are often masked by forward and backward masks so that they can be displayed for longer periods of time without the subject being able to recognize the priming stimuli. A forward mask is briefly displayed before the priming stimulus and a backward mask usually follows it to prevent the subject from recognizing the stimulus.

== Auditory stimuli ==
=== Auditory masking ===
One method for creating subliminal auditory stimuli is masking, which involves hiding the target auditory stimulus in some way. Auditory subliminal stimuli are shown to have some effect on the participant, but not a large one. For example, one study used other speechlike sounds to cover up the target words, and it found evidence of priming in the absence of awareness of the stimuli. The effects of these subliminal stimuli were only seen in one of the outcome measures of priming, while the effects of conscious stimuli were seen in multiple outcome measures. However, the empirical evidence for the assumption of an impact of auditory subliminal stimuli on human behavior remains weak; in an experimental study on the influence of subliminal target words (embedded into a music track) on choice behavior for a drink, authors found no evidence for a manipulative effect.

=== Self-help audio recordings ===
A study investigated the effects on self-concept of rational emotive behavior therapy and auditory subliminal stimulation (separately and in combination) on 141 undergraduate students with self-concept problems. They were randomly assigned to one of four groups receiving either rational-emotive therapy, subliminal stimulation, both, or a placebo treatment. Rational-emotive therapy significantly improved scores on all dependent measures (cognition, self-concept, self-esteem, anxiety) except behavior. Results for the subliminal stimulation group were similar to those of the placebo treatment except for a significant self-concept improvement and a decline in self-concept-related irrational cognitions. The combined treatment yielded results similar to those of rational-emotive therapy, with tentative indications of continued improvement in irrational cognitions and self-concept from posttest to follow-up.

== Studies on advertising with subliminal stimuli in still images ==
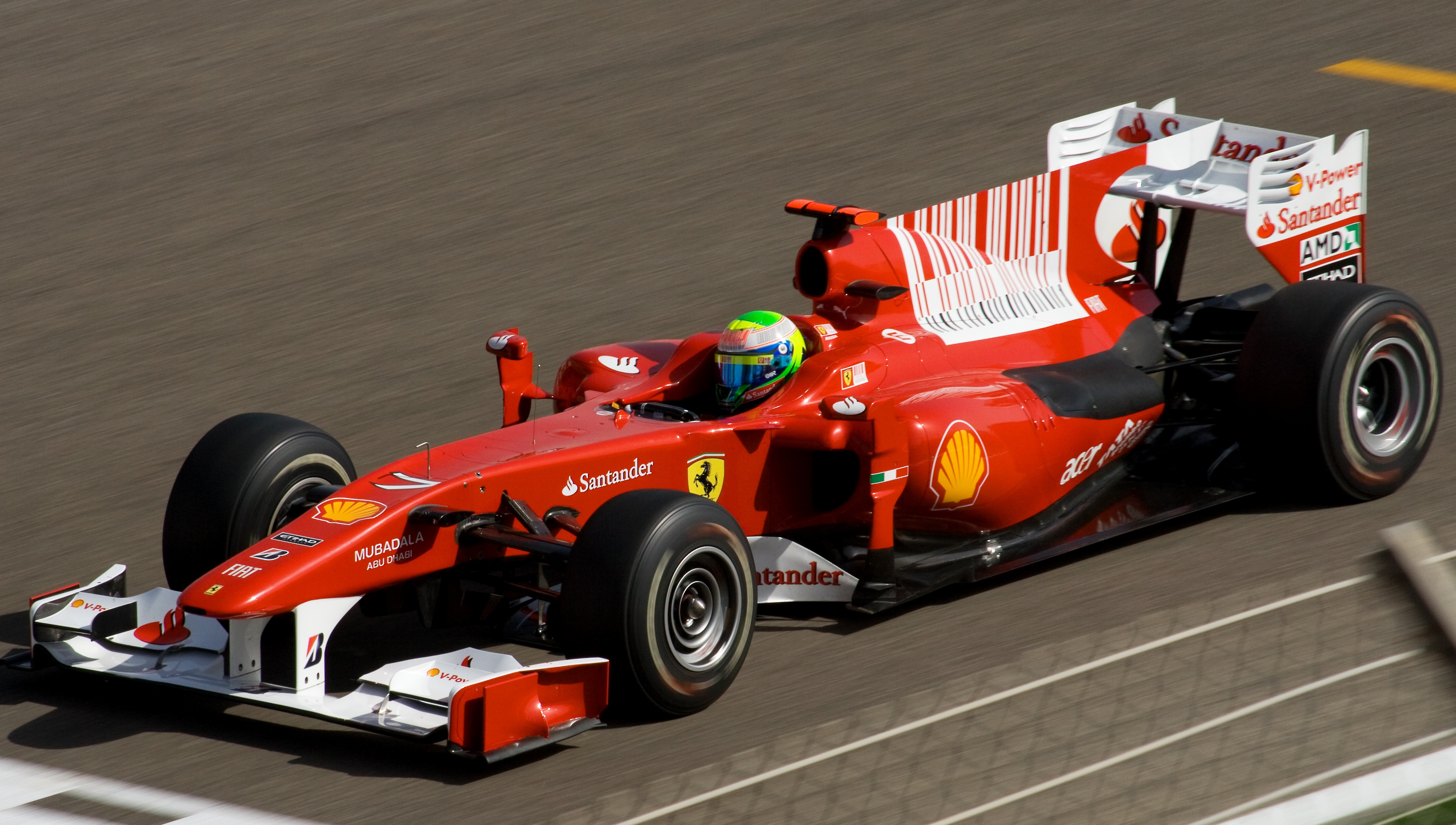
The prominent barcode pattern on this Ferrari F10 Formula 1 car served as advertising for Marlboro.

Among the researchers in favor of subliminal stimuli was Wilson Bryan Key. One of Key's most cited studies is a whisky ad in which he found several hidden figures in ice cubes. However, Cecil Adams characterises Key as "the kind of guy who could find something suggestive in a dial tone", citing an anecdote where Key objected to the use of subliminal sexual imagery in one of his own book covers, mistakenly believing that the publisher must have used an illustrative photo from an advertisement that employed subliminal stimuli. It had been a simple unaltered photograph of a martini glass.

Luís Bassat suggests an interesting observation by indicating that the current objective of advertising is "to get the consumer to take into account the brand when making the decision", a trend opposed to the objective of subliminal advertising. In turn, Fernando Ocaña showed that the essential thing in the field of media planning is to obtain the greatest possible memory, which implies a conscious perception and not a subconscious one.

== Consumption, television and criticism ==
Some studies looked at the efficacy of subliminal messaging in television. Subliminal messages produce only one-tenth of the effects of detected messages and the findings related to the effects of subliminal messaging were relatively ambiguous. Participants' ratings of positive responses to commercials were not affected by subliminal messages in the commercials.

Johan Karremans suggests that subliminal messages have an effect when the messages are goal-relevant. In a study, researchers made half of the 105 volunteers feel thirsty by giving them food with lots of salt before performing the experiment. At the end, as predicted, they found that the subliminal message had succeeded among the thirsty. 80% of them chose a certain ice tea brand versus the 20% of the control group that were not exposed to the message. Those who were not thirsty did not choose the drink in question, despite the subliminal message. The experiment suggests that in certain circumstances (i.e., in the confines of one limited study) subliminal advertising worked.

Karremans conducted a study assessing whether subliminal priming of a brand name of a drink would affect a person's choice of drink, and if this effect was caused by the individual's feelings of being thirsty. In another study, participant's ratings of thirst were higher after viewing an episode of The Simpsons that contained single frames of the word "thirsty", or of a picture of a Coca-Cola can. Some studies showed greater effects of subliminal messaging, with up to 80% of participants showing a preference for a particular rum when subliminally primed by the name being placed backwards in an advert. Martin Gardner, however, criticizes claims, such as those by Wilson Bryan Key, by pointing out that the "recent studies" serving as the basis for his claims were not identified by place or experimenter. He also suggests that claims about subliminal images are due to the "tendency of chaotic shapes to form patterns vaguely resembling familiar things". In 2009, the American Psychological Association stated that subliminal stimuli are subordinated to previously structured associative stimuli, and that their only role is to reinforce a certain behavior or a certain previous attitude, without there being conclusive evidence that the stimulus that provokes these behaviors is properly subliminal.

Currently, there is still speculation about this effect. Many authors have continued to argue for the effectiveness of subliminal cues in changing consumption behavior, citing environmental cues as a main culprit of behavior change. Authors who support this line of reasoning cite findings such as Ronald Millman's research that showed slow-paced music in a supermarket was associated with more sales and customers moving at a slower pace. Findings such as these support the notion that external cues can affect behavior, although the stimulus may not fit into a strict definition of subliminal stimuli because although the music may not be attended to or consciously affecting the customers, they are certainly able to perceive it.

Subliminal messaging is prohibited in advertising in the United Kingdom and France, as well as German television and radio.

== See also ==
- Automaticity – Ability to do things without occupying the mind with the low-level details required
- Brainwashing – Systematic coercive persuasion
- Earworm – Music or saying that sticks in the mind
- Hidden track – Music not detectable by casual listeners
- Hypnosis – State of increased suggestibility
- Peripheral vision horizon display (PVHD) – Aircraft cockpit instrument which assists pilots in maintaining proper attitude
- Pre-attentive processing – Subconscious accumulation of information from the environment
- Priming (psychology) – Alleged impact on behavior
- Response priming – Psychology experiment
- Subliminal messages in popular culture
- Suggestibility – Inclination to accept the suggestions of others
- Unconscious cognition – Mental processing without awareness
- Unconscious thought theory (Criticism) – Psychological theory
