= John Bargh =

American social psychologist (born 1955)

John A. Bargh
- Born: January 9, 1955; Champaign, Illinois
- Education: University of Michigan (Ph.D., 1981); New York University
- Known for: Perception-behavior link, goal-activation, unconscious processing
- Scientific career
- Fields: Social psychology
- Workplaces: Yale University

John A. Bargh (/ˈbɑːrdʒ/; born 1955) is an American social psychologist working at Yale University as the Susan Nolen-Hoeksema Professor Emeritus of Psychology and of Cognitive Science and Management. At Yale, he formed the Automaticity in Cognition, Motivation, and Evaluation (ACME) Laboratory. Bargh's work focuses on automaticity and unconscious processing as a method to better understand social behavior, as well as philosophical topics such as free will. Much of Bargh's work investigates whether behaviors thought to be under volitional control may result from automatic interpretations of and reactions to external stimuli, such as words.

Bargh is particularly famous for his research on priming and its effects on behavior. In one of his most well-known studies, Bargh and colleagues reported that participants who were exposed to words related to the elderly stereotype (e.g., "Florida", "Bingo") subsequently walked more slowly when exiting the laboratory, compared to participants who were exposed to neutral words. This study has been highly influential, with over 5,000 citations. However, attempts to replicate Bargh's studies have failed to find significant effects. So far, there has been a lack of successful preregistered replication studies, and the only support for priming effects come from several large-scale meta-analyses which can not adequately control for the substantial bias in this literature.

== Education and academic career ==
Bargh was born in Champaign, Illinois. He attended the University of Illinois as an undergraduate, where he graduated in 1977 with a B.S. in psychology. He then attended the University of Michigan, where he earned an M.A. in 1979 and a Ph.D. in 1981 in social psychology under Robert Zajonc. That same year he was hired as an assistant professor at New York University, where he remained for 22 years. In 2003, he moved to Yale to form the Automaticity in Cognition, Motivation, and Evaluation (ACME) Laboratory. He retired in 2025.

== Research ==
Bargh was influenced by the work of his Ph.D. advisor at the University of Michigan, Robert Zajonc, who concentrated on the fundamental processes underlying behavior, including an emphasis on affect and cognition. Much of Zajonc's work touched upon processes that occur outside of awareness. Bargh's work in automaticity and unconscious processing further explores the extent to which information processing occurs outside of either intent or awareness. In contrast to Ellen Langer, who denigrated such mental processing as "mindless", Bargh followed the lead of William James in stating that automatized (or "habitualized" in James' terminology) processing can be a beneficial adaptation. Bargh's research focuses on the influence of environmental stimuli on perception and behavior, automatic activation, the effects of conscious and unconscious priming, the psychological effects of physiological stimuli, and implicit cognition. Bargh's concentration on the influence of unconscious and automatic behavior and cognition grows from a fundamental interest in the construct of 'free will.'

=== Influence of unconsciously perceived stimuli ===
Exposure to stimuli in the environment can influence how individuals make impressions of others. Bargh and Pietromonaco randomly assigned subjects to be exposed to words that were either related to hostility or were neutral. The words were presented outside of the subjects' conscious awareness. In a second task, all subjects were asked to read an ambiguous story about a man and rate him on various measures. Those subjects that were subliminally exposed to words related to hostility rated the man more negatively than those subjects in the control condition.

Bargh and Pietromonaco's findings have been further supported by a meta-analysis conducted by Herring et al. (2013), which demonstrated the pervasiveness of automatic evaluation effects across a wide range of stimuli.

=== Automatic activation ===
Stimuli may be automatically evaluated in ways that affect behavior, an automatic evaluation. In a study conducted by Chen and Bargh, subjects were faster to pull a lever toward themselves (an approach tendency) when a word had a positive valence than a negative valence, and were similarly faster to push the lever away (an avoidance tendency) when the word had a negative valence compared to a positive valence. The "sequential evaluative priming paradigm" refers to the related phenomenon of response times reducing when primed by stimuli with congruent valence. In an examination of the generality of the effects of this paradigm, Bargh, Chaiken, Govender and Pratto show that simply seeing or hearing mention of stimuli triggers automatically activated evaluations. This occurs even when the subject has not been asked to think about their evaluation of the stimulus beforehand. It was further shown that novel stimuli are automatically evaluated and produce the same effect as nonnovel stimuli: when positively valenced novel stimuli prime positively valenced targets, reaction time is faster.

Stimuli presented outside of awareness have also been suggested to influence the interpretation of subsequent ambiguous and semantically unrelated stimuli. Thus subjects asked to define homographs after being subliminally primed with positive, negative, or neutral valence words subsequently evaluated the valence of the ambiguous words with that of the prime.

In Stereotype priming, subjects are primed with a stereotype or with people associated with those stereotypes. Subsequent behavior tends to be consistent with the stereotype. For instance, subjects primed with the concept of the elderly while doing a simple task, later walked more slowly when leaving the experiment than did subjects in the control group. Subjects that were primed with African American faces reacted with more hostility toward experimenters. (The first experiment in this paper primed the concept of politeness vs. rudeness (vs. a neutral control), and showed that people behaved in line with these primes afterward. These studies are small, though (e.g., Experiment 1: n=34).) The authors are clear in drawing a distinction between the priming used in these studies and the myth of subliminal messages. Whereas the latter were once thought to be able to influence people's behavior in a way out of line with the individual's intended behavior (i.e. to go buy a Pepsi while watching a movie), the automatic activation present in these studies was consistent with the activity at hand and therefore did not cause the subjects to alter their intended behavior.

Subsequent meta-analyses by Phaf et al. (2014), Slepian et al. (2012), and Rougier et al. (2018) have provided further support for the direct influence of automatic evaluations on approach and avoidance behaviors, as demonstrated by Bargh and colleagues.

=== Perception–behavior link ===
The Chameleon Effect refers to the unconscious tendency to mimic others' behavior. Chartrand and Bargh discovered and named this effect after observing subjects unconsciously mimic confederates. Subjects perform a task in which they work closely with a confederate that is trained to repeatedly engage in one of two behaviors: rubbing his or her face or jiggling a knee. Subjects tend to mimic the behavior of the confederate, both when the confederate makes eye contact and smiles frequently at the subject and when the confederate does not make eye contact and was non-smiling. Furthermore, when confederates mimic the behavior of the participant, the participant later rates the confederate as more 'likable' than confederates who do not mimic behavior. This effect was shown to be more pronounced in people that are more dispositionally empathetic. The authors suggest that this unconscious mimicry could lead to greater group cohesion and coordination.

=== Goal formation/activation ===
Stimuli are often interpreted and assessed based on their relevance to our goals. During goal pursuit, objects consistent with that goal are rated more positively than are goal-irrelevant objects tested in a sequential evaluative priming paradigm. These ratings also predict behavior towards those objects.

Beyond this, Bargh suggested that associations between goals, their related behaviors, and environments in which they are consistently pursued, can become linked in memory and be unconsciously activated to influence behavior without conscious awareness. Unconscious goals are activated with priming, or the presentation of a cue that automatically activates its related mental representation of the goal, which triggers related behaviors. For instance, subjects primed with an achievement or cooperation goal perform better on an intelligence task compared to subjects who are not primed.

Bargh suggests that unconscious goals are pursued flexibly, and automatically adapt to changing environments during tasks in the experiment. Bargh hypothesized that unconscious goals are represented mentally. Those mental representation influence behavior. For example, a mental representation of a relationship partner triggers goal-oriented behavior consistent with what is expected for that specific relationship. For example, subjects asked to bring to mind a mental representation of a "friend" were more helpful to a stranger than those asked to call to mind a "co-worker."

Bargh has also found that priming can influence self-regulation. Subject in a group exposed to words associated with "reappraisal" were contrasted with subjects in a group that received explicit instructions to try to reappraise their emotional state, with the goal of self-regulating their emotions. All subjects then gave a short oral presentation while having their heart rate monitored. Those merely perceiving reappraisal words were reported to have a significant reduction in heart rate, a reduction equal to that of subjects explicitly instructed to use reappraisal to control anxiety.

Recent meta-analyses by Weingarten et al. (2016), Dai et al. (2023), and Chen et al. (2021) have provided further evidence for the nonconscious activation and pursuit of goals, supporting Bargh and colleagues' earlier findings.

=== Physiology influencing psychology ===
Physical sensations may unconsciously translate into psychological interpretations. When subjects were asked to briefly hold a warm coffee mug, and then fill out an evaluation of a person described ambiguously, subjects reported warmer feelings toward the target person versus when they were asked to briefly hold an iced coffee. In a second study, subjects in the 'cold' condition were also more likely to choose a reward for themselves as opposed to giving the reward to their friend, whereas in the 'warm' condition participants were more likely to choose the reward for their friend. The physical properties of objects that subjects are touching can similarly influence social impression formation and decision-making. Bargh and his colleagues also found evidence of physical warmth influencing how giving and provincial participants were. Those who held the warm beverage were more likely to choose a reward or gift for a friend than for themselves. However three independent studies with larger samples failed to replicate the effect.

Bargh and Shalev are currently addressing how this psychological-physiological link can be used to regulate emotion. Correlation studies show that participants rated highly on a loneliness scale, also tend to take longer showers at higher water temperatures. In a follow-up study, a manipulation of physical warmth to make the subjects colder resulted in an increase on the loneliness scale. Altering one's physical situation can thus result in emotional responses, even without conscious awareness. A paper by Donnellan and colleagues reported 9 failures to replicate the results of Bargh and Shalev. However, Bargh and Shalev have successfully replicated their studies, indicating cultural differences in bathing and showering habits." "They also noted that in the 2 studies in which Donellan et al. attempted to most closely follow their original procedure, they did replicate their original results, but not in the other 7 studies in which considerable procedural changes were made.

=== Free will ===
In "Beyond Behaviorism", Bargh and Ferguson define both automatic and controlled processing as deterministic in nature, the difference being that the former occurs unintentionally and without volition, but that both are deterministic in that they have causes. They argue that most processing, including processing of stimuli that greatly influence behavior and decision making, occurs outside of consciousness. They suggest that only our inability to recognize the powerful activity occurring outside of awareness leads some to believe that they are the masters of their choices. Bargh posits, along with Daniel Wegner and other scientists in the field, that the concept of 'free will' is an illusion. Bargh and Earp make this point explicit: "Clearly it is motivating for each of us to believe we are better than average, that bad things happen to other people, not ourselves, and that we have free-agentic control over our own judgments and behavior—just as it is comforting to believe in a benevolent God and justice for all in an afterlife. But the benefits of believing in free will are irrelevant to the actual existence of free will. A positive illusion, no matter how functional and comforting, is still an illusion."

== Replication Debates ==
Some of Bargh's priming studies, particularly those involving social or goal priming, have been subject to replication controversies. Several researchers have reported failures to replicate specific findings, such as Doyen et al. (2012) on elderly priming and walking speed, Pashler et al. (2011) on elderly-related words priming slow walking, Harris et al. (2013) on high-performance-goal priming, Pashler et al. (2012) on social distance priming, and Rotteveel et al. (2015) on the link between affect and approach/avoidance tendencies. Bargh and others have noted methodological differences that could account for some of these discrepant results. For example, Doyen et al. used low-frequency French primes, which Ramscar et al. (2015) argue could significantly decrease the priming effect.

Ramscar et al. (2015) conducted a detailed quantitative analysis of Bargh et al.'s methods and materials, showing that both direct and conceptual replication attempts of many priming effects can be expected to fail over time, between languages, or across different age groups, simply because the learned behaviors that these studies seek to prime do not exhibit the invariance that typically supports direct replication in other areas of science. They argue that the dynamics of learning, as well as related cultural and linguistic changes, present serious challenges to the scientific study of priming, yet these factors are often overlooked by researchers. Bargh too has argued that priming effects can be sensitive to contextual factors and moderators, and that replication attempts should carefully consider these issues. None of these hypotheses have so far been confirmed in preregistered studies.

Several meta-analyses (e.g., Weingarten et al., 2016; Dai et al., 2023) and high-powered studies (e.g., Payne et al., 2016 on gambling primes) have found robust evidence for behavioral priming effects. A 2016 meta-analysis by Shariff et al. also supported the reliability of religious priming effects on prosocial behavior.

Critics have raised concerns about the replicability of priming studies more broadly, citing issues like publication bias and questionable research practices. Methods that assess publication bias (e.g., trim-and-fill, p-curve analysis) have generally indicated there is widespread bias in these literatures, but also leave open the possibility that there are some true non-zero effects in the literature. However, there are currently no preregistered studies have found support for small non-zero priming effects. Ongoing debates have highlighted the need for well-powered, preregistered studies and direct replications to establish if the priming effects in Bargh's studies exist, and if so, to establish their boundary conditions.

== Awards ==
- 2022 - Distinguished Scientist Award, Society for Experimental Social Psychology
- 2014 - Distinguished Scientific Contribution Award, American Psychological Association
- 2011 - Elected Fellow, American Academy of Arts and Sciences
- 2009 - Honorary Doctorate, University of Nijmegen
- 2007 - Society for Experimental Social Psychology Scientific Impact Award
- 2006 - Society for Personality and Social Psychology Donald T. Campbell Award
- 2001 - Guggenheim Fellowship
- 2001 - Fellow at the Center for Advanced Study in the Behavioral Sciences.
- 1990 - Annual Research Prize from the Max Planck Society (with Peter Gollwitzer)
- 1989 - American Psychological Association Early Career Award for contributions to psychology.
- 1982 - Society for Experimental Social Psychology Dissertation Award

== Publications ==
=== Books ===
- Leys, Ruth (2024) Anatomy of a Train Wreck: The Rise and Fall of Priming Research. Chicago: The University of Chicago Press ISBN 9780226836935
- Bargh, John (2017). Before You Know It: The Unconscious Reasons We Do What We Do. William Heinemann. ISBN 978-1-78515-002-9.
- Morsella, Ezequiel; Bargh, John A.; Gollwitzer, Peter M. (2009). Oxford handbook of human action. New York: Oxford University Press. ISBN 978-0-19-530998-0.
- Hassin, R.; Uleman, J.; Bargh, J, eds. (2005). The new unconscious. New York: Oxford University Press. ISBN 978-0-19-530769-6.
- Gollwitzer, P. M.; Bargh, J. A., eds. (1996). The psychology of action: Linking motivation and cognition to behavior. New York: Guilford Publications. ISBN 978-1-57230-032-3.
- Uleman, J. S.; Bargh, J. A., eds. (1989). Unintended thought. New York: Guilford Publications. ISBN 978-0-89862-379-6.

=== Articles ===
- Ackerman, J. M., Nocera, C. C., & Bargh, J. A. (2010). Incidental haptic sensations influence social judgments and decisions. Science.
- Bargh, J. A., Chen, M., & Burrows, L. (1996). Automaticity of social behavior: Direct effects of trait construct and stereotype priming on action. Journal of Personality and Social Psychology, 71, 230–244.
- Bargh, J. A., & Chartrand, T. L. (1999). The unbearable automaticity of being. American Psychologist, 54, 462–479.
- Bargh, J. A., & Ferguson, M. L. (2000). Beyond behaviorism: On the automaticity of higher mental processes. Psychological Bulletin, 126, 925–945.
- Bargh, J. A., Gollwitzer, P. M., Lee-Chai, A. Y., Barndollar, K., & Troetschel, R. (2001). The automated will: Nonconscious activation and pursuit of behavioral goals. Journal of Personality and Social Psychology, 81, 1014–1027.
- Bargh, J. A., & McKenna, K. Y. A. (2004). The Internet and social life. Annual Review of Psychology, 55, 573–590.
- Bargh, J. A. (2006). What have we been priming all these years? On the development, mechanisms, and ecology of nonconscious social behavior. European Journal of Social Psychology [Agenda 2006 article]
- Bargh, J. A. & Earp, B. D. (2009). The will is caused, not free. Dialogues, Society of Personality and Social Psychology, 24 (1), 13–15. pdf.
- Chartrand, T. L., & Bargh, J. A. (1999). The chameleon effect: The perception-behavior link and social interaction. Journal of Personality and Social Psychology, 76, 893–910.
- Chen, S., Lee-Chai, A. Y., & Bargh, J. A. (2001). Relationship orientation as a moderator of the effects of social power. Journal of Personality and Social Psychology, 80, 173–187.
- Dijksterhuis, A., & Bargh, J. A. (2001). The perception-behavior expressway: Automatic effects of social perception on social behavior. In M. P. Zanna (Ed.), Advances in experimental social psychology (Vol. 33, pp. 1–40). San Diego: Academic Press.
- Duckworth, K. L. Bargh, J. A. Garcia M. and Chaiken.S. (2002). The automatic evaluation of novel stimuli. Psychol Sci, 13, 513-9 DOI
- Ferguson, M.J. & Bargh, J.A. (2004). Liking is for doing: The effects of goal pursuit on automatic evaluation. Journal of Personality and Social Psychology, 87, 557–572.
- Ferguson, M. J., Bargh, J. A., & Nayak, D. A. (2005). After-affects: How automatic evaluations influence the interpretation of subsequent, unrelated stimuli. Journal of Experimental Social Psychology, 41, 182–191.
- Huang, J. Y., Song, H., & Bargh, J. A. (2011). Smooth trajectories travel farther into the future: Perceptual fluency effects on prediction of trend continuation. Journal of Experimental Social Psychology, 47(2), 506–508. doi:10.1016/j.jesp.2010.12.002
- Uhlmann, E., Poehlman, T., Tannenbaum, D., & Bargh, J. A. (2011). Implicit puritanism in American moral cognition. Journal of Experimental Social Psychology, 47(2), 312–320. doi:10.1016/j.jesp.2010.10.013
- Williams, L.W., Nocera, C.C., Gray, J.R., Bargh, J.A. (2009). The unconscious regulation of emotion: nonconscious reappraisal goals modulate emotional reactivity. Emotion. 2009 Dec;9(6):847-54.
