= Programming the Nation? =

2011 documentary film by Jeff Warrick

- Directed by: Jeff Warrick
- Written by: Jeff Warrick
- Produced by: Marty Collins
- Starring: Noam Chomsky, Amy Goodman, Dennis Kucinich, Eldon Taylor, & Wilson Bryan Key
- Cinematography: Marty Collins
- Edited by: Jeff Warrick
- Music by: Evan Evans and Robin Macomber
- Production companies: Digital Media Factory & Ignite Productions
- Distributed by: International Film Circuit
- Release dates: June 8, 2010 (Seattle True Independent Film Festival); August 19, 2011 (United States)
- Running time: 105 minutes
- Country: United States
- Language: English
- Budget: $500,000 (estimated)

Programming the Nation? is a 2011 feature social documentary written, produced, and directed by Jeff Warrick. The film explores subliminal programming in American mass media.

Kevin Thomas of the Los Angeles Times reviewed Programming the Nation? and noted that "Warrick is... rightly concerned by the power of media conglomerates to manipulate the news."

== Interviews ==
Interview subjects included:

- Noam Chomsky asserts that "The purpose of the ad is to delude and deceive you with imagery… [The public] will be uninformed and make an irrational choice. That’s what businessmen spend hundreds and millions of dollars a year on…what they want is coercion and control."
- August Bullock discusses Sigmund Freud's probing of the subconscious mind, and his postulations about the presence of hidden emotions and drives. According to Bullock, Freud believed the barrier between conscious and subconscious awareness relaxed and through analysing and interpreting dreams, we could better understand out underlying motivations and emotions and the conflicts caused by them.
- Wilson Bryan Key states, "You look at something, smell something, hear something, it's going into your brain at the speed of light... And all being retained..." Key claims that only small bits and fragments of this actually rise to the "conscious surface." Key also claims that Freud warned about "toying" with the subconscious due to its highly unexplored and misunderstood nature, coupled with its capacity to set off unpredictable pathological response.
- Dennis Kucinich says, "There should be criminal implications for this kind of behaviour, media manipulation” Kucinich states.
- Douglas Rushkoff, asserts that Edward Bernays, Freud's nephew, utilized Freudian psychoanalytic theory to provide consumers with substitutes for their carnal urges in the form of a product.
- Dr. Eldon Taylor claims that public relations pioneer Edward Bernays, in his 1928 book Propaganda, states that it's "the duty of marketing people to lead an otherwise, unleadable, irrational, free people to making a consensus or a decision that was a responsible decision." Taylor says marketing is founded on manipulation and influence.
- Amy Goodman states, “They have a responsibility to bring out full diversity of opinion and to get to the truth, not to bring you news stories that are disguised as their own when they are simply government or corporate propaganda.”

== Cast ==
| John B. Alexander | Richard Beggs |
| Nick Begich Jr. | August Bullock |
| Noam Chomsky | Christopher Coppola |
| Phillip Farber | David Fricke |
| Amy Goodman | Hilton A. Green |
| Anthony Greenwald | Andy Johns |
| Wilson Bryan Key | Dennis Kucinich |
| Jerry Mander | Mark Crispin Miller |
| Mark Mothersbaugh | William Poundstone |
| Douglas Rushkoff | Joe Schimmel |
| Howard Shevrin | Ann Simonton |
| Geoff Tate | Eldon Taylor |
| Diane Watson | Bill Yousman |

== Screenings ==
- Seattle True Independent Film Festival - June 8, 2010
- Carnegie Community Center Vancouver, B.C. - June 12, 2010
- St. Pete for Peace Film Series - October 27, 2010
- Theatrical Premiere - New York City - August 19–25, 2011
- True Crime New York Series: Post 9/11 Universe - Sept. 16, 2011
