= Unconscious thought theory =

Psychological theory

Unconscious thought theory (UTT) posits that the unconscious mind is capable of performing tasks outside of one's awareness, and that unconscious thought (UT) is better at solving complex tasks, where many variables are considered, than conscious thought (CT), but is outperformed by conscious thought in tasks with fewer variables. It was proposed by Ap Dijksterhuis and Loran Nordgren in 2006.

The theory is based primarily on findings from comparing subjects presented with a complex decision (for instance which of several apartments is the best?), and allowed either (1). very little time, (2). ample time, or (3), ample time but are distracted and thereby prevented from devoting conscious attentional resources to it. It is claimed that subjects unable to devote conscious processing to the task outperform both those who can spend time deliberating and those who must respond immediately. Dijksterhuis and Nordgren interpreted these findings as strong support for the idea of UT being superior to CT, and used them in part to justify six principles distinguishing UT from CT.

This position runs counter to most research on unconscious processing conducted over the last 40 years, which has found unconscious processes to be characterized by simple responses, and to be incapable of complex operations. Unconscious Thought Theory has come under stiff criticism from researchers unable to replicate the original effects.

"When making a decision of minor importance, I have always found it advantageous to consider all the pros and cons. In vital matters however ... the decision should come from the unconscious, from somewhere within ourselves."

— Sigmund Freud, cited in Dijksterhuis (2004)

== Description ==
Unconscious thought theory runs counter to decades of mainstream research on unconscious cognition (see Greenwald 1992 for a review). Many of the attributes of unconscious thought according to UTT are drawn from research by George Miller and Guy Claxton on cognitive and social psychology, as well as from folk psychology; together these portray a formidable unconscious, possessing some abilities far beyond those of conscious thought. UTT is in this respect reminiscent of some classical views of the unconscious that emerged as far back as the early twentieth century. Both UTT and Freudian psychoanalytic theory hold that complex operations are performed by the unconscious, but where Freud's theory suggests that the unconscious represses harmful memories to protect one's ego, UTT's version of UT performs rational operations to complete unsolved cognitive or affective tasks. Helmholtz's theory of unconscious inference also shares UTT's view that the unconscious' reasoning mediates our interpretation of the world, but UTT differs from unconscious inference by its clear assertion that unconscious thought is a time-consuming process; Helmholtz's famous use of perception as an example of unconscious inference suggests that unconscious thought, for him, operates much more quickly. Probably the most striking contrast UTT has with today's understanding of the unconscious is that between its main claim and studies on implicit perception. Researchers like Anthony Greenwald have used subliminal semantic activation tasks to evaluate unconscious thought by presenting words very quickly to prevent them from entering conscious thought. The unconscious' inability to process more than one word at a time has led these researchers to conclude that unconscious thought is unsophisticated. But UTT holds that unconscious thought is very sophisticated, enjoying benefits like freedom from bias and the ability to integrate disparate pieces of information more efficiently than conscious thought.

== Conscious and unconscious thought ==
Definition of CT
Dijksterhuis defines conscious thought as the thought processes one is aware of and can introspect on. For example, when someone asks you, "Why did you do that?" and you can report on the thoughts you used to give your answer, then those thoughts are conscious.
Attributes of CT
Performed on tasks or objects within one's attention; low-capacity; relies on schemas to process information efficiently; bad at weighting the importance of decision factors; processes information using strict rules.
Definition of UT
Unconscious thought, for Dijksterhuis, is simply the opposite of conscious thought in that it involves any thought that you cannot introspect on. This might happen when you are writing and frustrated at not having the right word, but then it simply pops into your head, and you do not know what steps you took to retrieve it; this is called incubation.
Attributes of UT
Performed on tasks or objects outside of one's attention; high capacity; does not rely on schemas or heuristics (thanks to its high capacity) and therefore not susceptible to bias; good at weighting attributes of decision objects; processes information via association; goal-dependent.

== The deliberation-without-attention effect ==
Conscious thought is generally considered to lead to good decisions. However, because conscious thinking has a low capacity to process multiple factors, conscious thought on an issue will lead to a poorer decision when applied to complex issues. Conversely, unconscious thought is generally considered to lead to poor choices. However, “the quality of choice does not deteriorate with increased complexity,” meaning unconscious thought actually leads to better decisions regarding complex issues. For example, when presented with complex information about 4 apartments, each with different desirability, individuals who were informed, then distracted, and finally asked to choose an apartment made better decisions than individuals who were asked to either choose immediately or think about it for some time and then choose. The individuals who were distracted before choosing an apartment engaged only in unconscious thought regarding the decision and made better decisions than those engaged in conscious thought. However, we wouldn't expect this trend to continue for a simpler decision. This is the basis for the deliberation-without-attention hypothesis: that quality of choice depends on the relation between mode of thought (conscious or unconscious) and the complexity of the choice.

Researchers Ap Dijksterhuis, Maarten W. Bos, Loran F. Nordgren, and Rick B. van Baaren tested this hypothesis in a series of studies measuring choice quality and post-choice satisfaction after participants used conscious and unconscious deliberation.

The first study presented participants with information about 4 different cars, each with a different level of desirability. One group was presented with 4 attributes of each car (simple product) and the other group was presented with 12 attributes of each car (complex product). Within these groups, some individuals were asked to think about the car for 4 minutes and then make a choice (conscious thought) while the others were distracted for 4 minutes and then asked to make a choice (unconscious thought). Unconscious thought led to better decisions in the group evaluating a complex product, while conscious thought led to better decisions in the group evaluating a simple product, illustrating the deliberation-without-attention effect.

A second study evaluated post-choice satisfaction as it relates to conscious and unconscious thinkers. Shoppers from two stores were polled: IKEA (complex products) and Bijenkorf (simple products). These shoppers were asked as they left if they were aware of the product they purchased before going on the shopping trip and how much they thought about the product between seeing it for the first time and buying it. A few weeks later, the same shoppers were asked how satisfied they were with their purchase. Those who engaged in conscious thought were more satisfied with their purchases from Bijenkort (simple products) then those who engaged in unconscious thought. Conversely, those who engaged in unconscious thought were more satisfied with their purchases from IKEA (complex products) then those who engaged in conscious thought. Again, this illustrates the deliberation-without-attention effect, but outside of a laboratory setting.

Two other studies were also done as part of this research. Together, the studies supported the deliberation-without-attention effect: conscious thinkers were better able to make more desirable choices between simple products, but unconscious thinkers were better able to choose between complex products. Furthermore, after making a complex decision, conscious thinkers were less likely to be satisfied with their choice than unconscious thinkers. The researchers conclude by suggesting this effect could be generalized outside the world of consumers, perhaps proving applicable to political choices, managerial choices, etc.

== The origins of UTT ==
In light of the difference in capacity between CT and UT, Dijksterhuis used a series of five experiments to test two hypotheses about the decision-making process of unconscious thought. The first hypothesis was that in complex decision making, being able to use UT will lead to better decisions than when one makes decisions immediately and is unable to use UT; the second was that when making complex decisions, users of only UT will outperform users of a combination of UT and CT.

The standard UTT experimental paradigm is as follows:

1. Subjects are instructed to perform the complex task of "forming an impression" of four decision objects (e.g., apartments, potential roommates, or cars – things for which one must consider many variables).
2. Subjects are presented with a set of normatively positive or negative descriptive attributes for each object (For example, two positive attributes are: Apartment 2 is in the city center and, Apartment 3 is fairly large). One object is rationally the "best" choice based on its possession of a majority of positive attributes (75%), while two of the other three are "mediocre" choices and the last one a "bad" choice (possessing only 50% or 25% positive attributes, respectively).
3. Subjects are placed into one of three conditions and then told that they will have to evaluate or decide between the decision objects. A Distraction condition requires subjects to focus on a complex task like solving anagrams, preventing any conscious thought but allowing for unconscious thought. A Deliberation condition requires subjects to think about their evaluation of the objects, allowing both conscious and unconscious thought. A third Control condition requires subjects to report their answer immediately, allowing only for minimal conscious and unconscious thought.
4. Which object is chosen most by each group (i.e., the normatively good, okay, or poor object) reveals differences in decision-making effectiveness between unconscious thought (Distraction), unconscious and conscious thought together (Deliberation), and minimal thought (Control).

Using this method, Dijksterhuis found that subjects in the Distraction condition made better choices than either the Deliberation or Control conditions, and concluded that unconscious thought alone is superior to conscious thought for making complex decisions. He then published unconscious thought theory with Loran Nordgren.

== From UTT: six principles distinguishing UT from CT ==
=== The unconscious thought principle ===
The Unconscious Thought Principle asserts the existence and nature of two kinds of thought: conscious and unconscious. Conscious thought is defined as "object-relevant or task-relevant cognitive or affective thought processes that occur while the object or task is the focus of one's conscious attention", while unconscious thought simply occurs when the object or task is outside of attention.

=== The capacity principle ===
According to cognitive psychologist George Miller, one cannot hold more than seven items, plus or minus two, in conscious working memory; unconscious thought does not have this restriction. UTT's Capacity Principle assumes this seven plus-or-minus-two rule to be true.

=== The bottom-up versus top-down principle ===
Given its low capacity, conscious thought must use a "top-down" style of processing that uses shortcuts or schemas to work efficiently. Because its capacity is unbounded, unconscious thought instead uses a "bottom-up" style of processing that avoids schemas, integrating information efficiently and avoiding the bias that schemas might bring to conscious thought.

=== The weighting principle ===
Research by Timothy Wilson and Jonathan Schooler demonstrated how deliberation between choice objects and introspecting on one's reasoning process results in poorer choice satisfaction than when one does not introspect. Combining this finding with Dijksterhuis' that people also apparently make better decisions when distracted than when deliberating, Dijksterhuis and Nordgren posited the Weighting Principle: that unconscious thought is better than conscious thought at appropriately weighting the relative importance of choice objects' attributes.

=== The rule principle ===
According to Guy Claxton, conscious thought employs rule-based thinking, following formal rules much like those of traditional logic, whereas unconscious thought instead uses associations that are either inherent or learned through experience, as in classical conditioning. In agreement with Claxton, the Rule Principle holds that conscious thought follows stringent rules and is accordingly precise, whereas unconscious thought engages in associative processing. Unconscious thought may conform to rules even though it does not follow them. That is, although the process used to generate an output unconsciously is different than the process used in conscious thought, unconscious thought's output may well be identical or similar to that of conscious thought.

=== The convergence principle ===
When asked about the secret behind their brilliant work, Nobel Prize winners and famous artists have often cited incubation, saying that simply understanding the problem they wanted to solve and not paying mind to it somehow procured a solution. In addition to these introspective accounts, the Convergence Principle cites experiments demonstrating the merits of unconscious thought in creativity to suggest that conscious thought is focused and "convergent", using only information directly relevant to a goal or task, while unconscious thought is more "divergent", bringing to bear information that has less obvious relation to the goal or task at hand. In this way, long periods of unconscious thought precipitate ingenuity where conscious thought would stagnate.

== Criticism of UTT ==
UTT has been challenged both on its very existence and, if it exists, on its generalizability. The scientific journal Judgment and Decision Making has published several studies over the years that fail to provide support for the unconscious thought theory.

The earliest meta-analysis of UTT, done by Acker, found no support for the claim that UT is superior to CT in complex decision making.

In the largest analysis to date, examining all studies to-date and contributing a large-scale replication study (N = 399), Nieuwenstein et al. (2015) stated that the "large-scale replication study yielded no evidence for the UTA, and the meta-analysis showed that previous reports of the UTA were confined to underpowered studies that used relatively small sample sizes." They concluded that

"There exists no reliable support for the claim that a momentary diversion of thought leads to better decision making than a period of deliberation."

Methodologically, Srinivasan et al. (2013) argued that periods of attentional processing occurring during an "unconscious" thought period may be critical for decision making.

Other challenges to UTT have argued that it cannot incorporate relevant cognitive and social psychological knowledge, that the suggestion given by Dijksterhuis to use UT for complex decisions is inappropriate in certain choice environments, and offer alternative interpretations of Dijksterhuis' and his colleagues' findings.

== Summary ==
It is known that unconscious thought can interpret single words or images, and that deliberating over a simple problem for too long can be disadvantageous. It remains unclear under what circumstances, if any, it is best to delegate decision problems to one's unconscious by diverting attention from them (see Payne, Waroquier and Srinivasan & Mukherjee), and to what extent logical, rule-based thought processes can occur outside of awareness. More fundamentally, it is still unknown what exactly happens neurologically when unconscious thought occurs, a more thorough understanding of which may inform those trying to prescribe unconscious or conscious thought. (Antonio Damasio's recent book on the neurology of reason, Descartes Error: Emotion, Reason, and the Human Brain, while not a discussion of consciousness, argues for the existence of an evolved interaction that takes place in normal brains between emotion – an unconscious process, distinct from the conscious experience of feeling – and conscious reasoning.)

== See also ==
- Automaticity
- Subliminal stimulus
- Unconscious cognition
- Unconscious mind
