= Tanya Chartrand =

Social psychologist

- Occupation: Professor of Psychology

Academic background
- Education: Santa Clara University: New York University

Academic work
- Institutions: Duke University

Tanya L. Chartrand is a social psychologist known for her research on consumer behavior and on non-conscious processes influencing emotions, cognition, and behavior. Chartrand is the Roy J. Bostock Marketing Professor and Professor of Psychology and Neuroscience at Duke University.

She and her doctoral advisor, John Bargh, are widely cited for their groundbreaking research on social mimicry, which they referred to as the chameleon effect.

== Biography ==
Chartrand completed her B.S. degree in Psychology and Spanish at Santa Clara University in 1994. She attended graduate school at New York University where she obtained a M.A. in 1996 and a Ph.D. in Social Psychology with a concentration in Quantitative Psychology in 1999. Her dissertation was titled "Consequences of success and failure at automatic goal pursuit for mood, self-efficacy, and subsequent performance."

Chartrand was assistant professor of psychology at The Ohio State University from 1999 to 2003 before joining the Faculty of the Department of Psychology and Neuroscience and the Department of Business Administration at Duke University in 2003. She became a professor of Business Administration from 2008 to 2011. Chartrand's research has been funded by National Institute for Mental Health.

== Research ==
One of the major topics that Chartrand and her colleagues has researched is consumer behavior. This may include studies of how individuals pay for good and services and how it impacts their thoughts, feelings, and emotional attachment to the product as well as their future purchasing behavior. Chartrand has also studied nonverbal behavior and how we communicate with others through body language. This ties into her work on non-conscious processing because we act without thinking, which can give off a message to others that can be either intended or unintentional depending on our emotions.

Chartrand's field of study revolves heavily around the idea of automatic, non-conscious thinking. One of her most cited articles focused on automatic processing with three main ideas: automatic effects on perception, automatic goal pursuit, and automatic evaluation of one's experiences. Chartrand and her colleagues concluded that non-conscious mental systems play a critical role in human mental functioning and well-being. If these systems were not playing in our heads, we would fail to keep our feet on the ground, and lose track of our current environment.
