= Birthday-number effect =

Subconscious tendency of people to prefer the numbers in the date of their birthday

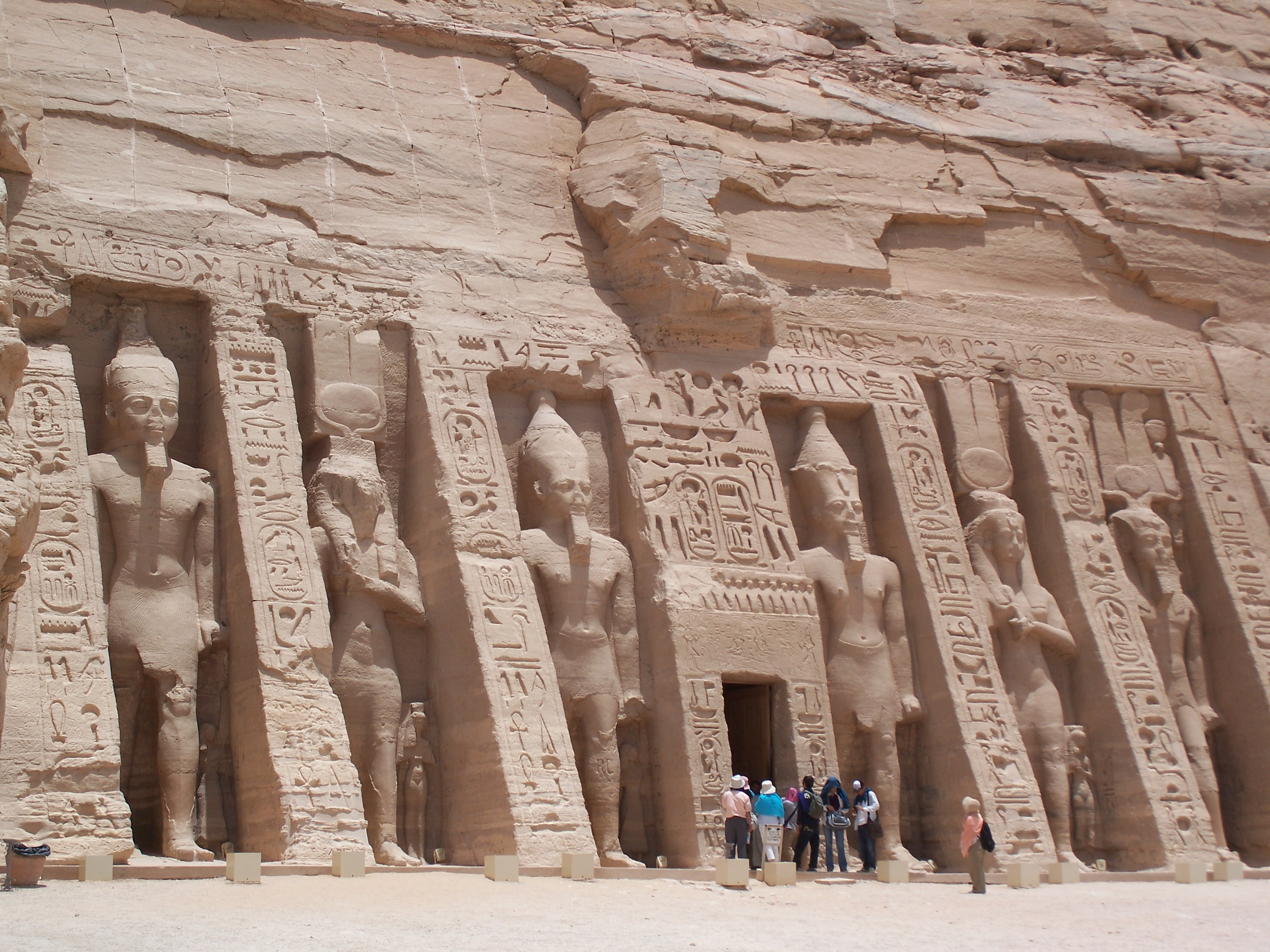
Abu Simbel temples, in Egypt, where the Sun is perpendicular to the face of the statue of Pharaoh on his birthday

The birthday-number effect is the subconscious tendency of people to prefer the numbers in the date of their birthday over other numbers. First reported in 1997 by Japanese psychologists Shinobu Kitayama and Mayumi Karasawa, the birthday-number effect has been replicated in various countries. It holds across age and gender. The effect is most prominent for numbers over 12.

Most people with self-esteem like themselves; the birthday is associated with the self, and hence those with high self-esteem tend to prefer the numbers in their birthday, despite the fact that those numbers appear in many other, very different contexts. People who do not like themselves tend not to exhibit the birthday-number effect. A similar effect, the name-letter effect, has been found for letters: people tend to prefer the letters that are part of their name. The birthday-number effect and the name-letter effect are significantly correlated. In psychological assessments, the Number Preference Task is used to estimate implicit self-esteem.

There is some evidence that the effect has implications for real-life decisions. One lab study revealed an increase in a favorable attitude towards prices when they were secretly manipulated to match subjects' birthday dates, thus resulting in a higher chance of purchase; a second study, using only birth year as price, did not lead to the same result. A study of the liking of products found that participants with high self-esteem liked products better if the product names unknowingly involved their birthday number and letters of their name. Some field research into the impact of the birthday-number effect on bigger life decisions (e.g. where to live) is controversial.

== Background ==
Throughout history, societies have had numbers they consider special. For example, in ancient Rome the number 7 was auspicious, in Maya civilisation the number 13 was sacred, in modern-day Japan people give three, five, or seven gifts for luck, and in China the number 8 is considered lucky and 4 is avoided whenever possible. In Western cultures the number 13 is often considered unlucky, hence the term triskaidekaphobia, fear of the number 13.

Controlled experiments with numbers date back to 1933 when the researcher Dietz asked Dutch people to name the first number to come to mind between 0 and 99. The number 7 was mentioned most, as it was in various later replicas of the study in other countries. (Note: When Kubovy and Psotka constrained the task to any number in the 20s, 27 came out as most mentioned. They argued that for this type of task, participants produce answers such that they appear to comply with the request for a spontaneous response. They speculated that the other numbers appear too obvious and that 7 is unique among the numbers from 0 to 9: it has no multiples among these numbers and neither is it a multiple of any of these numbers. However, young children do not apply this strategy and 7 does not come out on top in children of age eight and nine.) The number 7 also came out on top in studies that asked people to name their favourite number. In an online poll by Alex Bellos, a columnist for The Guardian, more than 30,000 people from all over the world submitted numbers, with 7 the most popular. All numbers under 100 were submitted at least once and nearly half of the numbers under 1,000. (Note: Odd numbers outnumbered even numbers. Bellos' explanation was that in both the East and the West odd numbers tend to have more spiritual significance than even ones. The brain also appears to process odd and even numbers differently: measuring reaction speed researcher Hines discovered that it takes people longer to judge an odd number to be odd than an even number to be even.) Marketing researchers King and Janiszewski investigated number preference in a different way. They showed undergraduate students random numbers and asked them to say quickly whether they liked the number, disliked it, or felt neutral. The number 100 had the highest proportion of people liking it (70%) and the lowest proportion of people disliking it (5%). The numbers 1 to 20 were liked by 9% more people than the higher numbers; the numbers that are the result of rote-learned multiplication tables (i.e. 2 × 2 to 10 × 10) were liked by 15% more people than the remaining numbers. The researchers concluded that number fluency predicts number preference: hence multiplication table numbers are preferred over prime numbers.

The closely related field of letter-preference research dates back to the 1950s. In 1985, Belgian psychologist Nuttin reported the unexpected finding that people tend to disproportionately prefer, unknowingly, the letters of their own name. The name-letter effect has been replicated in dozens of follow-up studies in different languages, cultures and alphabets, no matter whether participants selected their preferred letter from a random pair, or picked the top six of all letters in the alphabet, or rated each individual letter. Nuttin predicted that because the driving force behind the name-letter effect is an unconscious preference for anything connected to the self, there would also be a birthday-number effect.

== Original study ==
In 1997, researchers Shinobu Kitayama and Mayumi Karasawa observed that studies repeatedly showed that Japanese people do not seek to maintain and enhance their self-esteem, unlike Europeans and Americans. Whereas research with Western participants found that, on average, people falsely believe they are better than average, that they take credit for successes and blame others for failures, and that they overestimate the chances of good fortune happening to them, studies with Japanese did not reveal such self-enhancing tendencies. In addition, in cross-cultural studies, Japanese reported self-esteem to be hurt more by failures than boosted by successes, the opposite of what was reported by Americans. All these studies involved participants being aware that their self-esteem was being evaluated, and hence they are said to be measures of explicit self-esteem. This made Kitayama and Karasawa wonder. It seemed unlikely to them that Japanese have no positive feelings attached to their selves. They hypothesized that somehow Japanese do not allow these feelings to be detected overtly. To test this, they ran two experiments that hid the aim of assessing self-esteem, measuring instead implicit self-esteem. Because by definition implicit self-esteem is not accessible to introspection, measures of it do not rely on direct self-reports but on the degree to which objects associated with the self generate positive versus negative thoughts. The first experiment was a replica of Nuttin's 1987 study of letter preference, looking for an effect tied to letters of the participant's name. The second experiment involved numbers, looking for an effect tied to numbers representing the day of the month a participant was born (between 1 and 31) and the month of their birthday (between 1 and 12).

=== Method ===
For the letter experiment, they asked 219 Japanese undergraduate students to rate each of the 45 hiragana, part of the Japanese writing system, according to how much they liked it. For the number experiment, they asked 269 Japanese undergraduate students to rate the numbers between 0 and 49 on attractiveness. The number 49 was chosen as the upper limit to mask the true aim of the study, which 31 (being the maximum number of days in a month) might have hinted at. Likewise, the number 0 was included for disguise. Participants had to give ratings on a six-point scale, ranging from 1, if they disliked the number very much, to 6, if they liked it very much. Once done, participants were asked for various demographic data, including their birthdays.

=== Results ===
Analysis of the letter preference data revealed a name-letter effect: an enhanced liking for letters in the participant's own name. Analysis of the number preference data revealed a birthday-number effect. For each number, the researchers first calculated the mean liking by participants who did not have that number in their birthday. These means served as a baseline. For each participant 50 relative liking scores were computed between the baseline of a number and the actual preference. (Note: An alternative scoring algorithm is to take the mean of all of a respondent's ratings and subtract that from his or her birthday-number rating. But as Bosson, Swann, and Pennebaker later argued, this does not control for common preference effects.) The mean liking scores for different types of numbers showed that participants disproportionately preferred numbers in their birthday. The effect was stronger for higher numbers, over 12, than for lower numbers. The effect was weakest for males and their birth month (only a 0.03 difference from the mean), and strongest for females and the day of their birthday (0.77 difference with the mean). Overall, women showed a greater liking for the numbers in their birthday than men did.

=== Explanations ===
Kitayama and Karasawa concluded that the patterns in the findings from both experiments were most consistent with the hypothesis that the preference is due to an attachment to the self. These feelings leak out to stimuli that are closely associated with the self, not just names and birthdates, but also, implicitly, their constituent letters and numbers. (Note: Previous studies had already proven that birthdays are a positively valued part of the self-concept. Finch and Cialdini, for example, manipulated some participants into thinking they shared their birthday with Rasputin. These people rated him more favourably than the control group.) Since most people like themselves, most people are found to have positive feelings for these constituent parts. The researchers suggested that the effect is stronger for higher numbers because in daily life these numbers are less saturated with other meanings, other than their associations with birthdays.

An alternative explanation for the birthday-number effect that had to be tested is mere exposure. If it were true that the numbers in one's birthday are used disproportionately in one's daily life, then the preference for numbers in one's birthday could simply be a preference for what is most frequent. Zajonc found in his 1960s and 1980s lab studies that familiarity can strongly influence preference, and coined the term "mere exposure effect". But Kitayama and Karasawa argued that even if people did see numbers from their own birthday more, this would still be negligible in comparison to the overall quantity of numbers they encounter in daily life. (Note: Kitayama and Karasawa found a name-letter effect even for the high-frequency letters, which helped convince them mere exposure is not the driving force behind the two effects.) This is in line with the argument other researchers have used to rule out mere exposure as an explanation for the name-letter effect.

Kitayama and Karasawa concluded that Japanese people do indeed have warm feelings towards themselves, just like Americans and Europeans, but that these feelings are masked when explicitly asked for. They speculated that the reason for this masking lies in the Japanese tendency to attend to negative, undesirable features by way of improving the self.

== Subsequent studies ==
=== Early follow-up studies ===
The first follow-up study looked at cultural differences. Blass, Schmitt, Jones, and O'Connell used US undergraduate students as participants to replicate the original study. In their paper presented at the American Psychological Association's annual conference in Chicago, in August 1997, they reported the same result: a preference for birthday numbers. They did find a much stronger effect though, which according to the researchers could be due to Americans' tendency towards self-enhancement.

The second follow-up study was done in 1998 by Kitayama and Uchida. They sought to investigate the relationship between a person's name-letter effect and his or her birthday-number effect, given that Kitayama and Karasawa had suspected a single driving force behind both. As they had predicted, Kitayama and Uchida found that within a person the two effects were correlated. Later studies confirmed this finding.

In 2000, Bosson, Swann and Pennebaker tested seven measures of implicit self-esteem, including the birthday-number task and name-letter task, and four measures of explicit self-esteem. They used a seven-point rating scale instead of the six-point scale Kitayama and Karasawa had used, and they only looked at the day of the birthday. On average, respondents scored their birthday number 0.73 higher than the other numbers. When the researchers retested all seven implicit self-esteem measures, the birthday-number task was one of three that produced similar results. From the weak or non-significant correlations between the implicit and explicit self-esteem measures they concluded that implicit and explicit self-esteem are tapping different underlying constructs.

=== Later follow-up studies ===
Later studies investigated aspects of the effect. Koole, Dijksterhuis, and van Knippenberg sought to explore how automatic the preference process was. They did this with both numbers and letters. They divided participants into two groups. The first group was asked to give quick, intuitive reactions stating preferences for the stimuli. The second group was asked to reason why they liked some numbers better than others and to analyse which features of the numbers they liked. As the researchers had predicted, they found that both the birthday-number effect and name-letter effect disappeared in the 'thinking' condition. They argued that thinking about reasons instigates deliberative overriding of implicit self-esteem effects. This conclusion was supported by looking at correlations between the effects: whereas in the feeling condition the strength of a participant's birthday-number effect was correlated to his or her name-letter effect, no such correlation was found in the thinking condition.

Jones, Pelham, Mirenberg, and Hetts investigated how the effect held up under so-called 'threats' to the self. Earlier research by Koole, Smeets, van Knippenberg, and Dijksterhuis had already shown that the name-letter effect is influenced by a perceived threat. Jones, Pelham, Mirenberg, and Hetts first made some participants write about a personal flaw and then gave all participants the Number Preference Task and the Letter Preference Task. What they found was consistent with previous findings: people who liked themselves a lot liked the numbers in their birthday and the letters of their name even more when an aspect of their self seemed under threat. This is predicted by the theory of unconscious self-enhancement. It can not be explained by mere exposure theory.

Nickell, Pederson, and Rossow looked for effects with significant years. They asked 83 undergraduate students to rate, on a scale from 1 to 7, how much they liked the years between 1976 and 2001, the months of the year, the seasons, times of day, and even types of pet in an attempt to disguise the aim of the study. Analysis of the data showed that participants liked the year of their birth much more than the average of the four years after they were born. The researchers also found that the year of high school graduation was also liked better than average. Of the months of the year, the most liked month was the one in which the participants were born.

Falk, Heine, Takemura, Zhang and Hsu investigated the validity of implicit self-esteem measures to assess cultural differences. They subjected Canadian and Japanese participants to a series of tests, one of which was rating the numbers to 40 by how much participants liked them. Because the researchers saw little to no correlation between the various implicit self-esteem measures, they did not draw any conclusions about cultural differences. Stieger and Krizan explored cross-cultural differences in number preferences, specifically the day on which Christmas is celebrated as a contributor to number preference. They asked participants from six countries to rate numbers between 1 and 36. They found that in countries where gifts are exchanged on 24 December participants disproportionately preferred the number 24, whereas in countries that do this on 25 December participants preferred 25. They concluded that cultural influences need to be taken into account if these preferences are used to reflect individual differences.

== Application ==
In psychological assessments, the birthday-number effect has been exploited to measure implicit self-esteem. The Number Preference Task is often used in combination with the more popular Letter Preference Task, sometimes jointly called the Initials and Birthday Preference Task (IBPT). The most popular method to measure implicit self-esteem is the Implicit Association Test.

There is no standard method for applying the task. The most commonly used one is a rating task, which involves having participants judge all the numbers under a certain threshold (typically over 31 to mask the purpose of assessing connections to dates), indicating how much they like them on a 7-point rating scale. There is no standard algorithm for calculating implicit self-esteem. At least six algorithms are in use. In their meta-analysis of the name-letter effect, Stieger, Voracek, and Formann recommend using the ipsatized double-correction algorithm. The algorithms are typically applied to both the number of the day and of the month.

Stieger, Voracek, and Formann recommend that the task involve both letter preference and number preference, that it be administered twice, and that the instructions focus on liking rather than attractiveness. The Number Preference Task has been used to measure implicit self-esteem in contexts as diverse as parenting and mental habits.

== Wider implications ==
Researchers have looked for wider implications of the birthday-number effect on preferences, both inside and outside the lab. A body of controversial research under the umbrella of implicit egotism, starting with Pelham, Mirenberg, and Jones, has investigated whether people unknowingly make life decisions based on their name letters or birthday numbers. Skeptics say that the claim that letters influence life decisions is an extraordinary one that requires extraordinary evidence. Based on analysis of US field data Pelham et al. concluded that people disproportionately live in towns whose names contain numbers that match the numbers in their birthday. They looked at people who were born on 2 February, 3 March, 4 April, etc. up to 8 August, and at people who lived in towns with numbers in them, such as Two Rivers, Three Oaks, Four Corners, etc. But in his critical analysis of this study Simonsohn argued that its reliability is questionable, as it found only a small number of residents with matching numbers. Simonsohn tried to replicate the finding in different ways but without success. He found no effect of just the day of birthday on the town (e.g. the second of any month, not just February). He also found no effect of birthday number on street, address, or apartment number.

Jones, Pelham, Carvallo and Mirenberg investigated the influence of number preference on interpersonal attraction. In a lab study they showed US participants text profiles of people. The profiles came with a prominently displayed, seemingly arbitrary code that was explained as merely to help the researchers keep track of the profiles. One half of the participants were shown a code that matched their birthday (e.g. someone born on 8 September saw a partner profile with the code "09-08"); the other half a non-matching code (e.g. "03-23"). All participants were shown exactly the same profile. They had to rate how much they thought they would like the person in the profile. The results showed that participants liked the profiles significantly more when the code matched their own birthday numbers. Relative to participants in the control condition, participants in the birthday-association condition could at the end of the test more accurately recall the code, but only 5 of 110 participants mentioned the matching code as a potential influence. Jones et al. concluded that people's preferences for their own birthday numbers are potent enough to influence people's attraction to other people. Pelham and Carvallo subsequently looked at interpersonal attraction using field data. They used statewide marriage records to conclude that people disproportionately marry people who share their birthday numbers. They also found that brides disproportionately chose their own birthday numbers and birth months as wedding dates. (Note: There is a body of research into the effects of knowing a birthday match exists. Jiang, Hoegg, Dahl and Chattopadhyay examined the role of a salesperson and a potential customer knowingly sharing a birthday in a sales context. They found such an incidental similarity can result in a higher intention to purchase. This persuasive effect stems from the need for connectedness. Similarly, Burger, Messian, Patel, del Prado and Anderson investigated the impact sharing a birthday with someone has in the context of making a request. Some participants were led to believe they shared a birthday with the requester, who asked for an overnight critique of an eight-page English paper. Whereas in the control group 34% of participants complied with the request, in the birthday group 62% complied. Burger et al. wrote that this is caused by the incidental association producing fleeting feelings of attraction. Participants reacted in a heuristic fashion, acting as if they were dealing with a friend. An analysis of large databases of lottery number picks revealed that people disproportionately selected numbers matching their birthdays.)

Coulter and Grewal investigated if the birthday-number effect could be exploited in sales and marketing. Over 200 participants of an online survey were asked about an advertisement for a pasta dinner, where the price was secretly matched to the day of the month of their birthday. For example, someone born on the 16th of a certain month would see the price "$39.16". The researchers found that matching numbers increased price liking and purchase intention. When introducing a perceived threat to the self into the task, they found an exaggerated effect. From this they concluded that the positive affect linked to birthday-numbers transfers directly to consumers' price predilections, and ultimately affects their purchase intentions. Keller and Gierl sought to replicate Coulter and Grewal's study. They manipulated the prices in advertisements for pizza and a music streaming service to match the birthday (day, year) of the participants in their lab study. They did not find any disproportionate liking of matching prices, neither for the year the participant was born in or the day. Keller and Gierl concluded that there must be some prerequisites such as priming stimuli to trigger the effect, although they suggested it is possible that their participants, who all happened to have been born between 1990 and 1999, saw their birthyear as price so often in real life that it had become too common.

Smeets used name and birthday matching in a product-liking experiment. He made up product names for a DVD that matched both part of the participant's name and his or her birthday. For example, a participant named Mariëlle, born on 14 May, would get an ad for a DVD-player named "DVD-Ma 14" in the self-relevant condition and "DVD-Pu 30" in the control condition. He found that high self-esteem participants liked products more if the product names were self-relevant than if they were not. He also found the opposite happened among low self-esteem participants: they liked products better if they were not self-relevant.
