= Yoked control design =

Experimental research design

A yoked control design is a research design used in experiments in which matched research subjects are yoked (joined together) by receiving the same stimuli or conditions. In operant conditioning the yoked subject receives the same treatment in terms of reinforcement or punishment.

Yoked control designs are used in a variety of scientific disciplines, including learning sciences, social psychology, and psychophysiology.

== Example ==
First ten stimuli for a yoked pair
Irma Maes		Jef Jacobs	
A	U	A	U
D	M	D	M
R	T	R	T
G	I	G	I
V	S	V	S
E	N	E	N
A	P	A	P
L	M	L	M
H	F	H	F
E	I	E	I

In his research into the name-letter effect, Belgian experimental psychologist Jozef Nuttin created a yoked control design in which two subjects evaluated the same letters, separately. Some of the letters belonged to one subject's name, and some of the letters belonged to the other subject's name, while some were random. Crucially, in the experimental design subjects are not aware that they are choosing letters from their name. In this design any difference in preference between subjects would have to be based on whether the letter occurred in their name. For example, for the fictitious pair Irma Maes and Jef Jacobs the first stimulus was A and U: the last letter in Irma's first name and a letter not in her name. Both subjects had to circle the letter they preferred. The next stimulus was M and D: the penultimate letter from Irma's first name and a letter not part of her name. This was repeated for the remaining letters of her first name, and subsequently the letters of her last name, also in reverse order, and finally the letters of both of Jef's names. Oral instructions were given to feel a preference as fast as possible, without thinking. If the yoked subjects shared a letter, choosing it did not contribute to the measurement. Nuttin found that people significantly liked name letters more than non-name letters, without realising it.
