= Nominative determinism =

Correlation of name and career

Nominative determinism is the hypothesis that people tend to gravitate toward areas of work or interest that fit their names. The term was first used in the magazine New Scientist in 1994, after the magazine's humorous "Feedback" column noted several scientific studies carried out by researchers with remarkably fitting surnames. These included a book on polar explorations by Daniel Snowman and an article on urology by researchers named Splatt and Weedon. These and other examples led to lighthearted speculation that some sort of psychological effect was at work.

Since the term appeared, nominative determinism has been an irregularly recurring topic in New Scientist, as readers continue to submit examples. Nominative determinism differs from the related concept of the aptronym, and the Latin idea of nomen est omen ('the name is an omen'), in that it focuses on causality. An aptronym merely means the name is fitting, without saying anything about why it has come to fit.

The idea that people are drawn to professions that fit their name was suggested by the psychologist Carl Jung, citing as an example Sigmund Freud who studied pleasure and whose surname means 'joy'. A few recent empirical studies have indicated that certain professions are disproportionately represented by people with appropriate surnames (and sometimes given names), though the methods of these studies have been challenged. One explanation for nominative determinism is implicit egotism, which states that humans have an unconscious preference for things they associate with themselves.

== Background ==
Historically, before people could gravitate toward areas of work that matched their names, many people were given names that matched their area of work. The way people are named has changed over time. In pre-urban times, people were known by a single name – for example, the Anglo-Saxon name Beornheard. (Note: Even the Romans, whose naming system is generally assumed to have used four names, started out with a single name, e.g., Romulus. Over the course of fourteen centuries this then first evolved to two names, to three names (e.g., Marcus Tullius Cicero, where Marcus is the praenomen, Tullius the nomen gentilicium, and Cicero the cognomen), back to two names, and finally one name again.) Single names were chosen for their meaning or given as nicknames. In England, it was only after the Norman Conquest that surnames appear, although some pre-Conquest individuals had a byname, such as Edmund Ironside; these bynames were not hereditary. Surnames were created to fit the person, mostly from patronyms (e.g., John, son of William, becomes John Williamson), occupational descriptions (e.g., John Carpenter), character or traits (e.g., John Long), or location (e.g., John from Acton became John Acton). Names were not initially hereditary; only by the mid-14th century did they gradually become so. Surnames relating to trades or craft were the first to become hereditary, as the craft often persisted within the family for generations. (Note: Ancient Roman fathers passed on their cognomen to their children as well. According to Gaius Plinius Secundus, better known as Pliny the Elder, cognomina derived from occupations were initially taken from agriculture – for example, Cicero means chickpea. Ergo, Marcus Tullius Cicero, the orator, was a descendant of a grower of chickpeas, although it is also said the cognomen was given for the shape of the nose being similar to that of a chickpea.) The appropriateness of occupational names has decreased over time, because tradesmen did not always follow their fathers: an early example from the 14th century is "Roger Carpenter the pepperer".

Another aspect of naming was the importance attached to the wider meaning contained in a name. In 17th-century England, it was believed that choosing a name for a child should be done carefully. Children should live according to the message contained therein, or the meaning of their names. In 1652, William Jenkyn, an English clergyman, argued that first names should be "as a thread tyed about the finger to make us mindful of the errand we came into the world to do for our Master". In 1623, at a time when Puritan names such as Faith, Fortitude and Grace were appearing for the first time, the English historian William Camden wrote that names should be chosen with "good and gracious significations", as they might inspire the bearer to good actions. With the rise of the British Empire, the English naming system and English surnames spread across large portions of the globe.

By the beginning of the 20th century, Smith and Taylor were two of the three most frequently occurring English surnames; both were occupational, though few smiths and tailors remained. (Note: Over time many surnames in patrilineal systems go extinct, sometimes leaving a few to dominate, depending on factors such as number of male children, immigration and merging women's surnames with their spouses upon marriage. A Korean surname has a 43% chance of being either Kim, Lee or Park. The Galton–Watson process models mathematically how much chance a surname has to survive. Under constant assumptions of 1 in 3 chance of 0, 1 or 2 sons, there is a 67% chance that by the fourth generation the surname has died out.) When a correspondence between a name and an occupation did occur, it became worthy of note. In an 1888 issue of the Kentish Note Book magazine, a list appeared with "several carriers by the name of Carter; a hosier named Hosegood; an auctioneer named Sales; and a draper named Cuff". Since then, a variety of terms for the concept of a close relationship between name and occupation have emerged. The term aptronym is thought to have been coined in the early 20th century by the American newspaper columnist Franklin P. Adams. The linguist Frank Nuessel coined "aptonym", without an "r", in 1992. Other synonyms include "euonym", "Perfect Fit Last Name" (PFLN), and "namephreak". In literary science, a name that particularly suits a character is called a "charactonym". Notable authors who frequently used charactonyms as a stylistic technique include Charles Dickens (e.g., Mr. Gradgrind, the tyrannical schoolmaster) and William Shakespeare (e.g., the lost baby Perdita in The Winter's Tale). Unlike nominative determinism, the concept of aptronym and its synonyms do not say anything about causality, such as why the name has come to fit.

Because of the potentially humorous nature of aptronyms, a number of newspapers have collected them. The San Francisco Chronicle columnist Herb Caen reported irregularly on reader-submitted examples, including a substitute teacher Mr. Fillin, a piano teacher Patience Scales, and the Vatican's spokesman on the evils of rock 'n' roll, Cardinal Rapsong. Similarly, the journalist Bob Levey on occasion listed examples sent in by readers of his column in The Washington Post: a food industry consultant named Faith Popcorn, a lieutenant called Sergeant, and a tax accountant called Shelby Goldgrab. A Dutch newspaper, Het Parool, had an irregularly featured column called "Nomen est omen" (Note: Nomen est omen is a Latin phrase meaning "the name is the sign". It is attributed to the Roman playwright Plautus.) with Dutch examples. Individual name collectors have also published books of aptronyms. The onomastic scholar R. M. Rennick called for more verification of aptronyms appearing in newspaper columns and books. Lists of aptronyms in science, medicine, and law are more reliable as they tend to be drawn from easily verifiable sources.

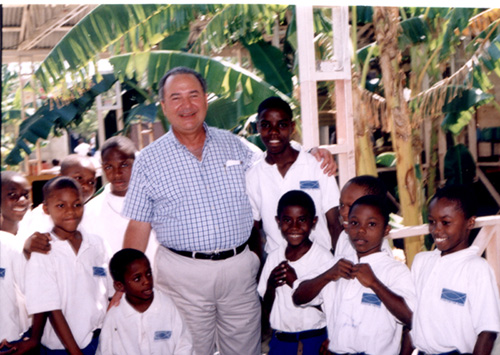
Robin Mahfood, former president and CEO of nonprofit organization Food for the Poor.

Though most examples of aptronyms consist of people's surnames, there are also cases of full names which correlate with their holders' careers. A humorous example is Robin Mahfood, who was CEO and president of nonprofit organization Food For The Poor until 2020. His name has a very similar pronunciation with the phrase "robbing my food", and its correlation with his charity work in donating food has made him the subject of internet memes.

== Definition ==
Nominative determinism, literally "name-driven outcome", is the hypothesis that people tend to gravitate toward areas of work that reflect their names. The name fits because people, possibly subconsciously, made themselves fit. Nominative determinism differs from the concept of aptronyms in that it focuses on causality.

The term has its origin in the "Feedback" column of the magazine New Scientist in 1994. A series of events raised the suspicion of its editor, John Hoyland, who wrote in the November 5 issue:

We recently came across a new book, Pole Positions—The Polar Regions and the Future of the Planet, by Daniel Snowman. Then, a couple of weeks later, we received a copy of London Under London—A Subterranean Guide, one of the authors of which is Richard Trench. So it was interesting to see Jen Hunt of the University of Manchester stating in the October issue of The Psychologist: "Authors gravitate to the area of research which fits their surname." Hunt's example is an article on incontinence in the British Journal of Urology by A. J. Splatt and D. Weedon. We feel it's time to open up this whole issue to rigorous scrutiny. You are invited to send in examples of the phenomenon in the fields of science and technology (with references that check out, please) together with any hypotheses you may have on how it comes about.

The editors of Feedback, John Hoyland and Mike Holderness, subsequently adopted the term nominative determinism as suggested by the reader C. R. Cavonius. The term first appeared in the December 17 issue. Even though the magazine tried to ban the topic numerous times over the decades since, readers kept sending in curious examples. These included the U.S. Navy spokesman put up to answer journalists' questions about the Guantanamo Bay detention camp, one Lieutenant Mike Kafka; authors of the book The Imperial Animal, Lionel Tiger and Robin Fox; and the UK Association of Chief Police Officers' spokesman on knife crime, Alfred Hitchcock.

As used in New Scientist the term nominative determinism applies only to work. In contributions to other newspapers, New Scientist writers have stuck to this definition, with the exception of the editor Roger Highfield in a column in the Evening Standard, in which he included "key attributes of life". (Note: Others have extended the area of influence; for example researchers Keaney et al. entitled their study into the relationship between people called Brady and those who had pacemakers inserted for bradycardia "The Brady Bunch? New evidence for nominative determinism in patients' health".)

Prior to 1994, other terms for the suspected psychological effect were used sporadically. "Onomastic determinism" was used as early as 1970 by Roberta Frank. The German psychologist Wilhelm Stekel spoke of "Die Verpflichtung des Namens" (The obligation of the name) in 1911. Outside of science, "cognomen syndrome" was used by the playwright Tom Stoppard in his 1972 play Jumpers. In Ancient Rome, the predictive power of a person's name was captured by the Latin proverb "nomen est omen", meaning 'the name is a sign'. This saying is still in use today in English and other languages such as French, German, Italian, Dutch, Slovenian and Polish.

New Scientist coined the term "nominative contradeterminism" for people who move away from their name, creating a contradiction between name and occupation. Examples include Andrew Waterhouse, a professor of wine; a would-be doctor, Thomas Edward Kill, who subsequently changed his name to Jirgensohn; and the Archbishop of Manila, Cardinal Sin. (Note: Over the years New Scientist has reported on other variations on the theme, including 'onomatopoeic nominative determinism' (e.g., European Space Agency chief mission scientist Bernard Foing), 'nominative indeterminism' (to explain the existence of hundreds of scientific articles whose authors include a Wong and a Wright), and 'occupational preferentialism' (the hypothesis that one's work influences one's taste, for example policemen liking Constable's paintings).) The synonym "inaptronym" is also sometimes used.

== Research ==
=== Theoretical framework ===
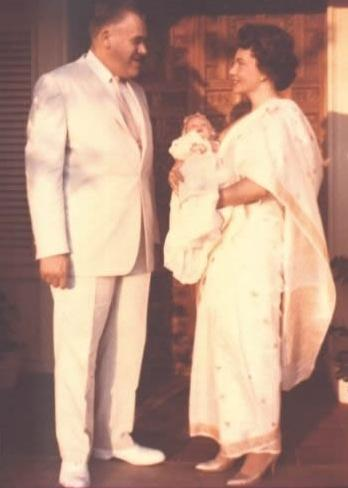
Mark L. Prophet, prophet, founder of The Summit Lighthouse

The first scientists to discuss the concept that names had a determining effect were early 20th-century German psychologists. Wilhelm Stekel spoke of the "obligation of the name" in the context of compulsive behaviour and choice of occupation; Karl Abraham wrote that the determining power of names might be partially caused by inheriting a trait from an ancestor who was given a fitting name. He made the further inference that families with fitting names might then try to live up to their names in some way. In 1952, Carl Jung referred to Stekel's work in his theory of synchronicity (events without causal relationship that yet seem to be meaningfully related):

We find ourselves in something of a quandary when it comes to making up our minds about the phenomenon which Stekel calls the "compulsion of the name". What he means by this is the sometimes quite gross coincidence between a man's name and his peculiarities or profession. For instance ... Herr Feist (Mr Stout) is the food minister, Herr Rosstäuscher (Mr Horsetrader) is a lawyer, Herr Kalberer (Mr Calver) is an obstetrician ... Are these the whimsicalities of chance, or the suggestive effects of the name, as Stekel seems to suggest, or are they "meaningful coincidences"?

Jung listed striking instances among psychologists—including himself: "Herr Freud (Joy) champions the pleasure principle, Herr Adler (Eagle) the will to power, Herr Jung (Young) the idea of rebirth ..."

In 1975, the psychologist Lawrence Casler called for empirical research into the relative frequencies of career-appropriate names to establish if there is an effect at work or whether we are being "seduced by Lady Luck". He proposed three possible explanations for nominative determinism: one's self-image and self-expectation being internally influenced by one's name; the name acting as a social stimulus, creating expectations in others that are then communicated to the individual; and genetics – attributes suited to a particular career being passed down the generations alongside the appropriate occupational surname.

In 2002, the researchers Pelham, Mirenberg, and Jones explored Casler's first explanation, arguing that people have a basic desire to feel good about themselves and behave according to that desire. These automatic positive associations would influence feelings about almost anything associated with the self. Given the mere ownership effect, which states that people like things more if they own them, the researchers theorised that people would develop an affection for objects and concepts that are associated with the self, such as their name. (Note: Studies have shown that most people like the name given to them. Extensive research also has found a strong effect called the name-letter effect: when given the choice between letters, people significantly prefer the ones from their own name.) They called this unconscious power implicit egotism. Uri Simonsohn suggested that implicit egotism applies only to cases where people are nearly indifferent between options, and therefore it would not apply to major decisions such as career choices. Low-stakes decisions such as choosing a charity would show an effect. Raymond Smeets theorised that if implicit egotism stems from a positive evaluation of the self, then people with low self-esteem would not gravitate toward choices associated with the self, but possibly away from them. A lab experiment confirmed this.

=== Empirical evidence ===
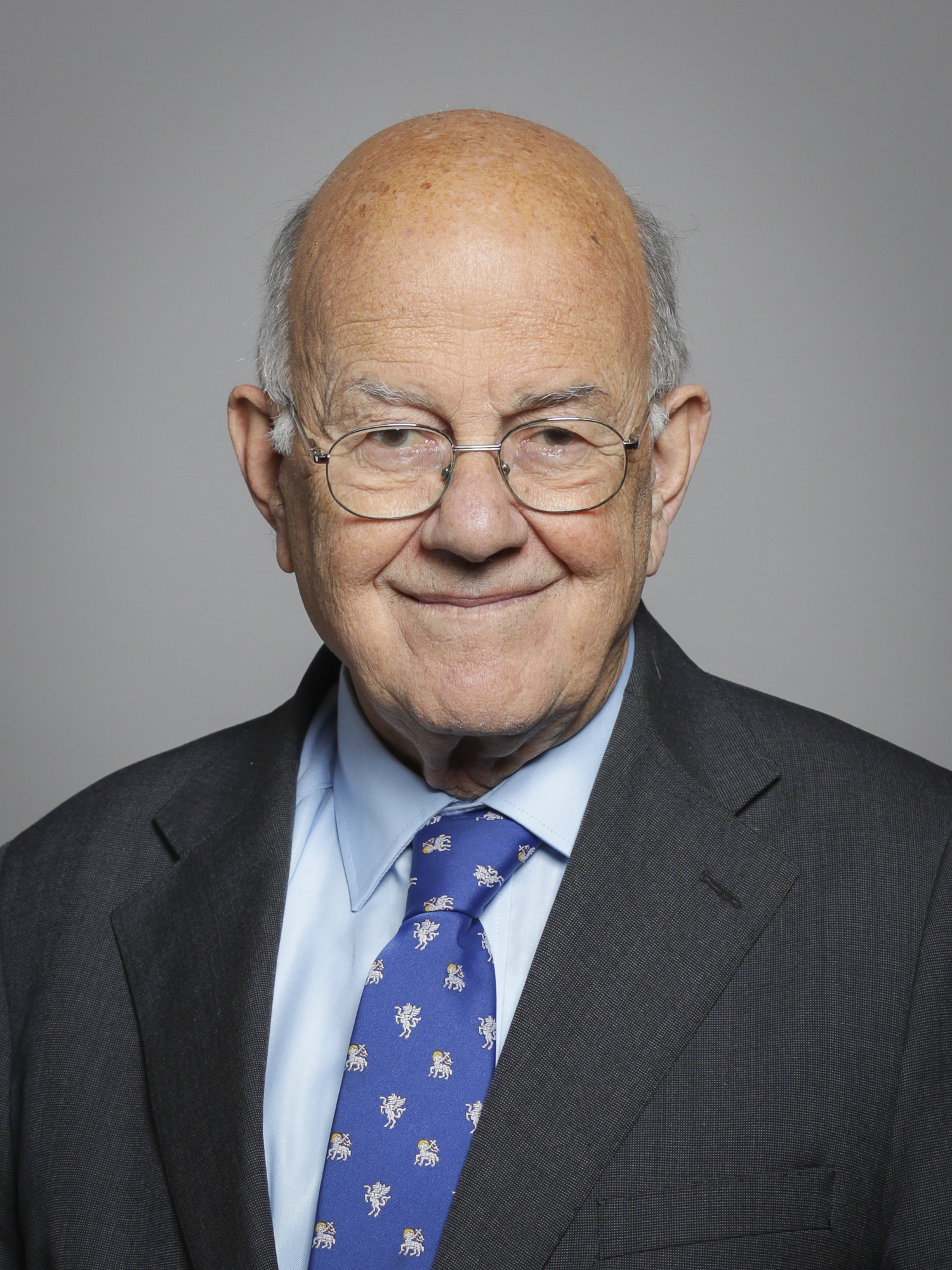
Igor Judge, Lord Chief Justice of England and Wales from 2008 to 2013

Those with fitting names give differing accounts of the effect of their name on their career choices. Igor Judge, former Lord Chief Justice of England and Wales, said he has no recollection of anyone commenting on his destined profession when he was a child, adding "I'm absolutely convinced in my case it is entirely coincidental and I can't think of any evidence in my life that suggests otherwise." James Counsell, on the other hand, having chosen a career in law just like his father, his sibling, and two distant relatives, reported having been spurred on to join the bar from an early age and he cannot remember ever wanting to do anything else. Sue Yoo, an American lawyer, said that when she was younger people urged her to become a lawyer because of her name, which she thinks may have helped her decision. Weather reporter Storm Field was not sure about the influence of his name; his father, Frank Field, also a weather reporter, was his driving force. Psychology professor Lewis Lipsitt, a lifelong collector of aptronyms, was lecturing about nominative determinism in class when a student pointed out that Lipsitt himself was subject to the effect since he studied babies' sucking behaviour. Lipsitt said "That had never occurred to me." Church of England vicar the Reverend Michael Vickers denied being a Vickers had anything to do with him becoming a vicar, suggesting instead that in some cases "perhaps people are actually escaping from their name, rather than moving towards their job".

I remember as a child people saying to me "of course you are going to be a barrister because of your name". How much is down to the subconscious is difficult to say, but the fact that your name is similar may be a reason for showing more interest in a profession than you might otherwise. Any link in adult eyes may seem trivial but to someone in their formative years starting to think about their career it's possible it may have an effect.

— James Counsell, barrister

While reports by owners of fitting names are of interest, some scientists, including Michalos and Smeets, have questioned their value in deciding whether nominative determinism is a real effect. Instead, they argue that the claim that a name affects life decisions is an extraordinary one that requires extraordinary evidence. To select only those cases that seem to give evidence for nominative determinism is to ignore those that do not. Analysis of large numbers of names is therefore needed. In 2002, Pelham, Mirenberg, and Jones analysed various databases containing first names, surnames, occupations, cities and states. In one study, they concluded that people named Dennis gravitate toward dentistry. They did this by retrieving the number of dentists called Dennis (482) from a database of US dentists. They then used the 1990 Census to find out which male first name was the next most popular after Dennis: Walter. The likelihood of a US male being called Dennis was 0.415% and the likelihood of a US male being called Walter was 0.416%. The researchers then retrieved the number of dentists called Walter (257). Comparing the relative frequencies of Dennis and Walter led them to their conclusion that the name Dennis is overrepresented in dentistry. However, in 2011, Uri Simonsohn published a paper in which he criticized Pelham et al. for not considering confounding factors and reported on how the popularity of Dennis and Walter as baby names has varied over the decades. Given Walter was a relatively old-fashioned name, it was far more likely for Pelham et al. to find people named Dennis to have any job, not just that of dentist, and people named Walter to be retired. Simonsohn did indeed find a disproportionally high number of Dennis lawyers compared to Walter lawyers. (Note: Confounding variables have also played a role in research into monogrammic determinism: in 1999 Christenfeld, Phillips, and Glynn concluded that people who have positive monograms (e.g., ACE or VIP) live significantly longer than those with negative initials (e.g., PIG or DIE). This conclusion was based on analysis of thousands of California death certificates between 1969 and 1995. Morrison & Smith subsequently pointed out that this was an artifact of grouping data by age at death. Frequency of initials changing over time could be a confounding variable. Indeed when grouping the same data by birth year, they found no statistically significant relationship between initials and longevity.)

Aware of Simonsohn's critical analyses of their earlier methods, Pelham and Mauricio published a new study in 2015, describing how they now controlled for gender, ethnicity, and education confounds. (Note: Initially Pelham and colleagues defended their methods in a rebuttal Simonsohn assessed as also lacking in diligence.) In one study, they looked at census data and concluded that men disproportionately worked in eleven occupations whose titles matched their surnames; for example, baker, carpenter, and farmer.

In 2009, Michalos reported the results of an analysis of the occurrences of people with the surname Counsell registered as independent barristers in England and Wales versus those with the name in England and Wales as whole. Given the low frequency of the name in England and Wales as a whole, he expected to find no one registered, but three barristers named Counsell were found.

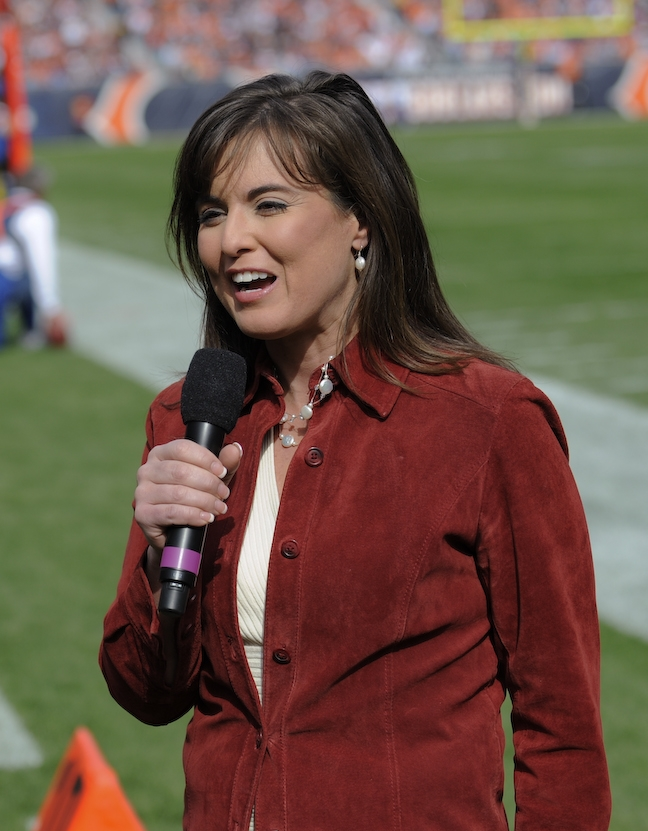
Amy Freeze, meteorologist

In 2015, researchers Limb, Limb, Limb and Limb found that British doctors have surnames related to their specialties more often than expected by chance. Reproductive medicine had the largest proportion, with 1 in 52 doctors having specialty-relevant surnames including Horn, Hussey, and Woodcock. Second was urology, with 1 in 59 related names such as Burns, Waterfall, Ball, and Koch. "Dr Pain" appeared most commonly in general surgery.

Selected data from Limb, Limb, Limb and Limb
| Specialty | Surname frequency | Surname examples |
|---|---|---|
| Cardiology | 8 (1 in 213) | Hart, Pump, Payne |
| Dermatology | 4 (1 in 243) | Boyle or Hickey |
| General medicine | 63 (1 in 101) | Mysore, Safe, Warning |
| General surgery | 56 (1 in 91) | Gore, Butcher, Boyle, Blunt |
| Paediatric medicine | 46 (1 in 119) | Boys, Gal, Child, Kinder |
| Plastic surgery | 7 (1 in 140) | Carver, Mole, Price |

In 2010, Abel came to a similar conclusion. In one study, he compared doctors and lawyers whose first or last names began with three-letter combinations representative of their professions – for example, "doc", "law" – and likewise found a significant relationship between name and profession. Abel also found that the initial letters of physicians' last names were significantly related to their subspecialty. For example, Raymonds were more likely to be radiologists than dermatologists.

As for Casler's third possible explanation for nominative determinism, genetics researchers Voracek, Rieder, Stieger, and Swami found some evidence for it in 2015. They reported that today's Smiths still tend to have the physical capabilities of their ancestors who were smiths. People called Smith reported above-average aptitude for strength-related activities. A similar aptitude for dexterity-related activities among people with the surname Tailor, or equivalent spellings thereof, was found, but it was not statistically significant. In the researchers' view, a genetic-social hypothesis appears more viable than the hypothesis of implicit egotism effects.

== Related theories ==
The Theory of Deadly Initials was an hypothesis published in the Journal of Psychosomatic Research in 1999, which proposed that there is a link between the lifespan of human males and their initials. The research, carried out by psychologists Nicholas Christenfeld, David Phillips and Laura Glynn, and published in the paper "What's in a Name: Mortality and the Power of Symbols", suggested that men with "negative" sets of initials (e.g. DIE or PIG) have, on average, a shorter lifespan than those with "positive" initials (e.g. ACE, VIP).

The average increase in life expectancy for a set of positive initials was claimed to be 4.48 years, while the average decrease in life expectancy for negative initials was claimed as 2.8 years. This is attributed to stress from teasing and lower self-worth in individuals with "deadly" initials.

In 2005, the hypothesis was investigated by Gary Smith, an economics professor at Pomona College in Claremont, California, and Stilian Morrison, a student there. They were unable to find any pattern in the samples they studied.

The original research was conducted by comparing the age of people who died within a given year, while the second investigation compared the lifespans of people who were born in a given year.

== See also ==
- Linguistic relativity
- Aptronym

== Bibliography ==
- Abel, Ernest L. (2010). "Influence of Names on Career Choices in Medicine". Names: A Journal of Onomastics. 58 (2): 65–74. doi:10.1179/002777310X12682237914945. S2CID 72072901.
- Abraham, Karl (1979). "On determining the power of names (1911)". Clinical Papers and Essays on Psychoanalysis. London: Karnac Books. pp. 31–32. ISBN 978-1-78181-144-3.
- Alter, Adam (2013). Drunk Tank Pink: And Other Unexpected Forces That Shape How We Think, Feel, and Behave. London: Penguin Press. ISBN 978-1-78074-264-9.
- American Council of Learned Societies (1998). Surnames in the United States Census of 1790: An Analysis of National Origins of the Population. Baltimore, Maryland: Genealogical Publishing Company. ISBN 978-0-8063-0004-7.
- Bateson, Patrick; Martin, Paul (2001). Design for a Life: How Biology and Psychology Shape Human Behavior. New York: Touchstone. ISBN 978-0-684-86933-9.
- Bennett, H.J. (1992). "A piece of my mind. Calling Dr Doctor". JAMA. 268 (21): 3060. doi:10.1001/jama.268.21.3060. PMID 1306061.
- Camden, William (1984). Dunn, R.D. (ed.). Remains Concerning Britain. Toronto: University of Toronto Press. ISBN 978-0-8020-2457-2.
- Casler, Lawrence (1975). "Put the Blame on Name". Psychological Reports. 36 (2): 467–472. doi:10.2466/pr0.1975.36.2.467. S2CID 144178932.
- Cavill, Paul (2016). "Language-based approaches to names in literature". In Hough, Carole (ed.). The Oxford Handbook of Names and Naming. Oxford Handbooks in Linguistics Series. Oxford: Oxford University Press. ISBN 978-0-19-965643-1.
- Christenfeld, N.; Phillips, D.P.; Glynn, L．M. (1999). "What's in a name: Mortality and the power of symbols". Journal of Psychosomatic Research. 47 (3): 241–254. doi:10.1016/S0022-3999(99)00035-5. PMID 10576473.
- Cole, Kristen (9 February 2001). "Is work calling your name?". George Street Journal. 25 (17). Archived from the original on 6 December 2003.
- Conrad, Barnaby (1999). The World of Herb Caen: San Francisco 1938–1997. San Francisco: Chronicle Books. ISBN 978-0-8118-2575-7.
- Copeland, Jack (2022). "Arthur Prior". In Zalta, Edward N.; Nodelman, Uri (eds.). The Stanford Encyclopedia of Philosophy. Metaphysics Research Lab, Stanford University.
- Danesi, Marcel (2012). Linguistic Anthropology: A Brief Introduction. Toronto: Canadian Scholars' Press. ISBN 978-1-55130-489-2.
- Dickson, Paul (1996). What's in a name?: Reflections of an Irrepressible Name Collector. Springfield, Massachusetts: Merriam-Webster. ISBN 978-0-87779-613-8.
- Duša, Zdravko; Kenda, Marjetka (2011). Nomen est omen: Čiginj in njegova imena (in Slovenian). Volče, Slovenia: Myra Locatelli. ISBN 978-961-92522-5-3.
- Flugel, Ingeborg (1930). "On the significance of names". British Journal of Medical Psychology. 10 (2): 208–213. doi:10.1111/j.2044-8341.1930.tb01017.x.
- Feedback (5 November 1994a). "Feedback". New Scientist (1950). Archived from the original on 23 December 2016.
- Feedback (17 December 1994b). "Feedback". New Scientist (1956). Archived from the original on 18 September 2016.
- Feedback (16 November 1996). "Feedback". New Scientist (2056). Archived from the original on 16 September 2016.
- Feedback (16 October 1999). "Feedback". New Scientist (2208). Archived from the original on 28 August 2016.
- Feedback (20 May 2000). "Feedback". New Scientist (2239). Archived from the original on 16 August 2016.
- Feedback (10 July 2004). "Feedback". New Scientist (2455). Archived from the original on 16 August 2016.
- Feedback (9 November 2005). "Feedback". New Scientist (2525). Archived from the original on 16 August 2016.
- Feedback (4 October 2006). "Feedback". New Scientist (2572). Archived from the original on 28 August 2016.
- Feedback (9 May 2007). "Feedback". New Scientist (2603). Archived from the original on 16 August 2016.
- Feedback (19 February 2014a). "Feedback: All shall have pills". New Scientist (2957). Archived from the original on 28 August 2016.
- Feedback (23 July 2014b). "Feedback: A whole world of Tweet". New Scientist (2979). Archived from the original on 28 August 2016.
- Feedback (3 June 2015). "Feedback: Scatological scorecards". New Scientist (3024). Archived from the original on 16 August 2016.
- Fibbi, Rosita; Kaya, Bülent; Piguet, Etienne (2003). Nomen est omen: quand s' appeler Pierre, Afrim ou Mehmet fait la différence (PDF) (in French). Bern: Fonds National Suisse, Direction du programme PNR43. ISBN 978-3-908117-69-8.
- Fowler, Alastair (2012). Literary Names: Personal Names in English Literature. Oxford: Oxford University Press. ISBN 978-0-19-165099-4.
- Frank, Roberta (1970). "Onomastic Play in Kormakr's Verse: the name Steingerðr". Mediaeval Scandinavia. 3: 7–34.
- Gerber, Sophia (2006). Nomen est omen - Morfologia dei nomi propri di persona italiani (in Italian). Munich: GRIN Verlag. ISBN 978-3-638-56044-3.
- Heller, Joseph (1961) [republished 1999]. Catch-22. New York: Simon & Schuster. ISBN 978-0-684-86513-3.
- Hoekstra, Hans (2001). Naam & Faam. Amsterdam: Nijgh & Van Ditmar. ISBN 978-90-388-3107-7.
- Hunt, Jen (1994). "The Psychology of Reference Hunting" (PDF). The Psychologist. 7 (10): 480. Archived from the original (PDF) on 20 June 2020.
- Jenkyn, William (1652). Exposition of the epistle of Jude. Bungay, England: John Guilds and son.
- Joubert, Charles E. (1985). "Factors Related To Individuals Attitudes Toward Their Names". Psychological Reports. 57 (3): 983–986. doi:10.2466/pr0.1985.57.3.983. S2CID 143641207.
- Jung, Carl (1972). Synchronicity – An Acausal Connecting Principle. London: Routledge and Kegan Paul. ISBN 978-0-7100-7397-6.
- Keaney, John J.; Groarke, John D.; Galvin, Zita; McGorrian, Catherine; McCann, Hugh A.; Sugrue, Declan; Keelan, Edward; Galvin, Joseph; Blake, Gavin; Mahon, Niall G.; O'Neill, James (2013). "The Brady Bunch? New evidence for nominative determinism in patients' health: retrospective, population based cohort study". British Medical Journal. 347 f6627. doi:10.1136/bmj.f6627. PMC 3898418. PMID 24336304.
- Lederer, Richard (2010). Crazy English. New York: Simon and Schuster. ISBN 978-1-4391-3894-6.
- Limb, C.; Limb, R.; Limb, C.; Limb, D. (2015). "Nominative determinism in hospital medicine". The Bulletin of the Royal College of Surgeons of England. 97 (1): 24–26. doi:10.1308/147363515X14134529299420.
- McKeown, J. C. (2010). A Cabinet of Roman Curiosities: Strange Tales and Surprising Facts from the World's Greatest Empire. Oxford: Oxford University Press. ISBN 978-0-19-975278-2.
- McKinley, Richard (1990). A History of British Surnames. Taylor & Francis.
- Merriam-Webster (1995). Merriam-Webster's Encyclopedia of Literature. Springfield, Massachusetts: Merriam-Webster. ISBN 978-0-87779-042-6.
- Michalos, Christina (2009). "In the Name of the Law". Counsel. 25 (4): 16–18.
- Morrison, Stilian; Smith, Gary (2005). "Monogrammatic determinism?". Psychosomatic Medicine. 67 (5): 820–824. doi:10.1097/01.psy.0000181283.51771.8a. PMID 16204444. S2CID 31044960.
- Nevid, Jeffrey S.; Rathus, Spencer A. (2009). Psychology and the Challenges of Life - Adjustment and Growth. Hoboken, New Jersey: John Wiley & Sons. ISBN 978-0-470-38362-9.
- Nuessel, Frank (1992). The Study of Names. Santa Barbara, California: Greenwood Press. ISBN 978-0-313-28356-7.
- Nuttin, Jozef M. (1985). "Narcissism beyond Gestalt and awareness: The name–letter effect". European Journal of Social Psychology. 15 (3): 353–361. doi:10.1002/ejsp.2420150309.
- Pelham, B.; Mirenberg, Matthew C.; Jones, John T. (2002). "Why Susie sells seashells by the seashore: Implicit egotism and major life decisions". Journal of Personality and Social Psychology. 82 (4): 469–487. doi:10.1037/0022-3514.82.4.469. PMID 11999918. S2CID 1677153.
- Pelham, Brett; Carvallo, Mauricio (2011). "The surprising potency of implicit egotism: A reply to Simonsohn". Journal of Personality and Social Psychology. 101 (1): 25–30. doi:10.1037/a0023526. PMID 21688926.
- Pelham, Brett; Mauricio, Carvallo (2015). "When Tex and Tess Carpenter Build Houses in Texas: Moderators of Implicit Egotism". Self and Identity. 4 (6): 692–723. doi:10.1080/15298868.2015.1070745. S2CID 145572523.
- Ratzan, Lee (2004). Understanding Information Systems: What They Do and why We Need Them. Chicago: American Library Association. ISBN 978-0-8389-0868-6.
- Rennick, R.M. (1982). "The Alleged "Hogg Sisters", or Simple Ground Rules for Collectors of "Odd" Names". Names. 30 (3): 193–198. doi:10.1179/nam.1982.30.3.193.
- Room, Adrian (1996). An Alphabetical Guide to the Language of Name Studies. Lanham, Maryland: Scarecrow Press. ISBN 978-0-8108-3169-8.
- Safire, William (2004). No Uncertain Terms: More Writing from the Popular "On Language" Column in The New York Times Magazine. New York: Simon and Schuster. ISBN 978-0-7432-5812-8.
- Salway, Benet (1994). "What's in a Name? A Survey of Roman Onomastic Practice from c. 700 B.C. to A.D. 700". The Journal of Roman Studies. 84: 124–145. doi:10.2307/300873. JSTOR 300873. S2CID 162435434.
- Schaffer-Suchomel, Joachim (2009). Nomen est Omen: Die verborgene Botschaft der Vornamen - Von Adam bis Zarah (in German). Munich: Goldmann Arkana. ISBN 978-3-641-01672-2.
- Simonsohn, Uri (2011). "Spurious? Name similarity effects (implicit egotism) in marriage, job, and moving decisions". Journal of Personality and Social Psychology. 101 (1): 1–24. doi:10.1037/a0021990. PMID 21299311. S2CID 207744109. Archived from the original on 12 November 2019.
- Simonsohn, Uri (2011b). "In defense of diligence: A rejoinder to Pelham and Carvallo (2011)". Journal of Personality and Social Psychology. 101 (1): 31–33. doi:10.1037/a0023232.
- Slovenko, R. (1983). "The Destiny of a Name". Journal of Psychiatry and Law. 11 (2): 227–270. doi:10.1177/009318538301100211. S2CID 166215791.
- Smeets, Raymond (2009). On the Preference for Self-related Entities: The Role of Positive Self-associations in Implicit Egotism Effects. Nijmegen, the Netherlands: UB Nijmegen. ISBN 978-90-90-24290-3.
- Smith-Bannister, Scott (1997). Names and Naming Patterns in England, 1538–1700. Oxford: Clarendon Press. ISBN 978-0-19-820663-7.
- Snowman, Daniel (1993). Pole Positions: Polar Regions and the Future of the Planet. London: Hodder & Stoughton. ISBN 978-0-340-54068-8.
- Splatt, A. J.; Weedon, D. (1977). "The Urethral Syndrome: Experience with the Richardson Urethroplasty". British Journal of Urology. 49 (2): 173–176. doi:10.1111/j.1464-410X.1977.tb04095.x. PMID 870138.
- Stekel, Wilhelm (1911). "Die Verpflichtung des Namens". Zeitschrift für Psychotherapie und medizinische Psychologie (in German). 3: 110–114.
- Stoppard, Tom (1972). Jumpers. London: Faber & Faber. ISBN 978-0-571-14569-0.
- Trench, Richard (1993). London Under London: A Subterranean Guide (2 ed.). London: John Murray. ISBN 978-0-7195-5288-5.
- Voracek, Martin; Rieder, Stephan; Stieger, Stefan; Swami, Viren (2015). "What's in a Surname? Physique, Aptitude, and Sports Type Comparisons between Tailors and Smiths". PLOS ONE. 10 (7): 699–702. Bibcode:2015PLoSO..1031795V. doi:10.1371/journal.pone.0131795. PMC 4498760. PMID 26161803.
- Weekley, Ernest (1914). The Romance of Names. London: John Murray.
- Wilson, Stephen (2003). The Means of Naming: A Social History. London: Routledge. ISBN 978-1-135-36836-4.

=== Websites ===
- Colls, Tom (20 December 2011). "When the name fits the job". BBC Radio 4. Archived from the original on 28 August 2016.
- Highfield, Roger (24 March 2011). "The name game - the weird science of nominative determinism". The Evening Standard. Archived from the original on 26 August 2016.
- Hoekstra, Hans (16 April 2011). "Nomen est omen" (PDF). Het Parool (in Dutch). Archived from the original (PDF) on 7 August 2016.
- Levey, Bob (20 November 1985). "Bob Levey's Washington". The Washington Post.
- Levey, Bob (29 August 2000). "Bob Levey's Washington". The Washington Post. Archived from the original on 25 June 2016.
- Nelson, Graham. "Meet ordinary humans whose names shaped their destiny". The Huffington Post. Archived from the original on 16 February 2016.
- Nunn, Gary (31 October 2014). "Reckless by name, reckless by nature?". The Guardian. Archived from the original on 25 August 2016.
- Silverman, Rachel Emma; Light, Joe (21 June 2011). "Dr. Chopp, Meet Congressman Weiner". The Wall Street Journal. Archived from the original on 27 September 2016.
- Telegraph staff (20 December 2011). "A person's surname can influence their career, experts claim". The Telegraph. Archived from the original on 4 September 2016.
