= Daniel Snowman =

British columnist

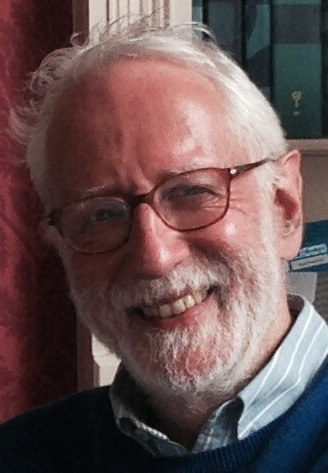
Daniel Snowman

Daniel Snowman (born 4 November 1938) is a British writer, historian, lecturer and broadcaster on social and cultural history. His career has spanned the academic world and the BBC, while his books include Kissing Cousins (a comparative study of British and American social attitudes); critical portraits of the Amadeus Quartet and of Plácido Domingo; a study of the cultural impact of The Hitler Émigrés; an anthology of essays about today's leading historians; The Gilded Stage: A Social History of Opera and Just Passing Through - Interactions with the World 1938 - 2021.

== Life and career ==
Snowman was born and raised in London, his parents coming from Anglo-Jewish families with roots in 19th-century Eastern Europe. He was educated at Cambridge (Double First-class degree in History) and Cornell (MA in Government) and from 1963–7 was a lecturer in Politics and American Studies at the University of Sussex. In 1967, he went to the BBC for a 6-month stint as a radio producer, rejoining as a full-time staff member in 1970. In 1967, too, Snowman joined the London Philharmonic Choir, an ensemble with whom he sang for 48 years, and whose history he has written.

At the BBC, Snowman was responsible for a wide variety of radio programmes on cultural and historical subjects, working with such established broadcasters as Bernard Crick, Robin Day, Bill Grundy, Lord Hailsham, William Hardcastle and John Vaizey while also helping develop the broadcasting careers of such younger figures as Susan Hill, Aled Jones, Norman Lebrecht, Roy Porter, Edward Seckerson and Lucie Skeaping. Snowman tended to specialize in ambitious series such as The Long March of Everyman, Whatever Happened to Equality?, A World In Common (world development issues), World Powers in the Twentieth Century, Northern Lights (a Radio 4 festival about the Arctic) and Fins de Siècle, an attempt to enter and recreate the sound world of the final years of each of the past six centuries. Many of these later appeared as books which Snowman helped edit. After leaving the BBC at the end of 1995, Snowman turned increasingly to writing and lecturing. From 2004 he has held a Senior Research Fellowship at London University's Institute of Historical Research; in 2010 he delivered the IHR Annual Fellows’ Lecture.

== Personal life ==
Snowman was briefly married to Alice Harris (1964–66). In 1975, he married Janet Levison and they have two children, Ben and Anna. The marriage ended in divorce in 2014.

== Publications ==
The Hitler Émigrés: The Cultural Impact on Britain of Refugees from Nazism concerned those who, having escaped the shadow of Nazism, found refuge in Britain and made a lasting mark on the nation's intellectual and cultural life, among them some of Britain's most celebrated artists, architects, musicians, choreographers, film makers, historians, philosophers, scientists, writers, broadcasters and publishers.

Historians, based on a long-running series of quarterly essays in the magazine History Today. Snowman examined the so-called ‘History Wave’, proposed some reasons for this, and suggested that, as people sought a usable ‘Heritage’ from the past as an aid to their own self-definition, the historian – who mediates between past and present – took on something of the function of the priest of earlier times. In Historians, he wrote about the life and work of some thirty of the most influential, including Asa Briggs, Peter Burke, David Cannadine, Natalie Zemon Davis, Richard J. Evans, Niall Ferguson, Roy Foster, Antonia Fraser, Eric Hobsbawm, Lisa Jardine, Ian Kershaw, Simon Schama and David Starkey.

The Gilded Stage: A Social History of Opera was a pioneering attempt to place the history of opera in its widest historical perspective. Thus, Snowman explored not only the traditional trio of composers, works and artists but also the financing and patronage of opera over the centuries, the changing nature of those in the operatic professions and their audiences, the history of theatrical architecture and of stage design, the impact of new technologies (gas, electric lighting, recording, photography, film etc.), and the globalization of opera in the 20th century.

Just Passing Through: Interactions with the World 1938 - 2021, a Memoir in which Snowman writes of a Jewish child's memories of the War, gives colourful inside accounts of life in Cambridge, JFK's America (including Civil Rights) and the new University of Sussex, of the BBC in its heyday, choral concerts under the world's top conductors and extended visits to the Arctic and Antarctic. He watches Churchill making one of his final speeches, interviews Harry Truman about Hiroshima, spends a week in Bayreuth with Wagner's daughter-in-law, meets Pope John-Paul II, Isaiah Berlin and Lord Snowdon, while getting to know Plácido Domingo and the most famous among the ‘Hitler Emigrés’.

== Articles and reviews ==
Articles and reviews by Daniel Snowman have appeared in: BBC History Magazine, BBC Music Magazine, Daily/Sunday Telegraph, Economist, English Historical Review, Gramophone, Guardian, Historical Research, Historically Speaking, History Today, Homes & Gardens, Independent, Jewish Chronicle, Jewish Renaissance, Journal of American Studies, Listener, Literary Review, Living History, Music and Musicians, Musical Times, New Society, New Statesman, Opera, Opera Now, Political Studies, Radio Times, Standard, Sunday Times, Times, Times Literary & Higher Education Supplements, Tribune.

His 'Short History of Opera' (and pages about voice types, etc.) was used on the official website of the Royal Opera House, Covent Garden, and in spring 2011 he was commissioned by the ROH to undertake an academic assessment of their Archives and historical Collections.

== Lectures and public events ==
For many years Snowman was a Frequent Lecturer at British arts festivals, academic and cultural institutions, luncheon clubs etc, and in a typical year would deliver over 50 illustrated talks and lectures across the UK and abroad. Since 1999 he presented over 750 illustrated lectures to members of The Arts Society (formerly NADFAS). In 2002 and again in 2006 he undertook a two-month, round-the-world lecture-and-research tour, including visits to various parts of Australia, New Zealand and North America. Daniel has also lectured for the Royal Opera (Covent Garden), Glyndebourne, English National Opera, the New York Metropolitan Opera Guild and Los Angeles Opera. In winter 2010/11, he delivered a six-part series of public lectures at the Royal Academy of Music on the Social History of Opera, and in 2017 presented a 12-week (36-session) course at the Victoria and Albert Museum to accompany their major exhibition on the subject – a lecture series he repeated at the V&A in 2018.

== Tours ==
He has also lectured on cruise liners, and between 2001-2014 he led over fifty music and opera tours for ACE, Cox & Kings, Martin Randall and other travel companies to many of the world's great cultural capitals, among them: Aix-en-Provence, Barcelona, Berlin, Bregenz, Budapest, Cracow, Dresden, Halle, Leipzig, Madrid, Milan, Munich, Naples, New York, Paris, Prague, Riga, Rome, Salzburg, Savonlinna, Seville/Andalucia, Stockholm, Torre del Lago, Turin, Valencia, Venice, Vienna and Warsaw.

== Books ==
- Why Not Let the Leaning Tower Collapse? (Brown Dog Books (23 Oct. 2024))
- Just Passing Through: Interactions with the World 1938 - 2021 (Brown Dog Books (16 Sept. 2021))
- Verdi (The History Press [Pocket Giants series], 2014)
- The Gilded Stage: A Social History of Opera (Atlantic Books, 2009; paperback edition, 2010; Italian edition (Il Palco d'oro) Elliot Edizioni, 2010; Chinese edition: Shanghai People's Publishing House, 2012; Spanish edition (La Ópera: Una historia social) Siruela, 2012; paperback 2016.
- Hallelujah! An informal history of the London Philharmonic Choir (London Philharmonic Choir, 2007)
- Historians (Palgrave Macmillan, 2007, paperback edition, 2016)
- The Hitler Émigrés: The Cultural impact on Britain of Refugees from Nazism (Chatto and Windus, 2002; Pimlico paperback 2003, reprinted 2010)
- PastMasters: The Best of 'History Today' (ed.) (Sutton: 2001)
- Fins de Siècle: How Centuries End, 1400-2000 (with Asa Briggs), (Yale University Press, 1996)
- Plácido Domingo's Tales From the Opera (BBC Books, 1994; Amadeus Press, USA, 1995)
- Pole Positions: The Polar Regions and the Future of the Planet (Hodder & Stoughton, 1993; Random House, Canada, 1993; Lubbe, 1994). It was this book that led the editors of New Scientist to the concept of nominative determinism, the hypothesis that people tend to gravitate towards areas of work that fit their name.
- Beyond the Tunnel of History: the 1989 BBC Reith Lectures (with Jacques Darras), (Macmillan (UK) and the University of Michigan Press, USA, 1990)
- The World of Plácido Domingo (The Bodley Head and McGraw-Hill, 1985; Arrow paperback 1986; Die Welt des Plácido Domingo, Schweizer Verlagshaus, 1986; new edition Domingo, 1992; Schott edition 1994; El Mundo de Plácido Domingo, Versal, Barcelona, 1986; Japanese edition, 1988; Hungarian edition, 1989)
- The Amadeus Quartet: The Men and the Music (Robson Books, 1981; Le Quattuor Amadeus, Buchet/Chastel, 1981)
- If I Had Been... Ten Historical Fantasies (ed.) (Robson Books, 1979)
- Kissing Cousins: An Interpretation of British and American Culture, 1945–1975 (Temple Smith, 1977; published in USA as Britain and America: An Interpretation of their Culture, New York University Press/Harper and Row, 1977); adapted and translated for use in Japan as English-language text, Kinseido Ltd, Tokyo
- Eleanor Roosevelt (Edito-Service, 1970); English and French language editions
- America Since 1920 (Harper and Row, 1968, and by Batsford, 1968 as USA: The Twenties to Vietnam. Republished in revised updated edition as America Since 1920 by Heinemann Educational Books, 1978, 1980, 1984)
