= Shinobu Kitayama =

Japanese social psychologist

- 北山 忍
- Born: March 9, 1957 (age 68); Shizuoka, Shizuoka Prefecture, Japan
- Education: Kyoto University; University of Michigan
- Known for: Cross-cultural psychology Cultural neuroscience
- Awards: Career Contribution Award from the Society for Personality and Social Psychology (2017)
- Scientific career
- Fields: Social psychology
- Institutions: University of Michigan
- Thesis: Attention as a mediator between affect and cognition: emotional tone and expectancy jointly determine accuracy in word perception (1987)

Shinobu Kitayama (Japanese: 北山 忍; born March 9, 1957) is a Japanese social psychologist and the Robert B. Zajonc Collegiate Professor of Psychology at the University of Michigan. He is also the Social Psychology Area Chair and Director of the Culture & Cognition Program at the University of Michigan. He is the editor-in-chief of the Attitudes and Social Cognition section of the Journal of Personality and Social Psychology. He received his bachelor's degree and master's degree from Kyoto University and his doctorate from the University of Michigan. Together with Mayumi Karasawa, he discovered the birthday-number effect, the subconscious tendency of people to prefer the numbers in the date of their birthday over other numbers. Prof. Kitayama is best known for his work on the social psychology of culture as it relates to the self. He and Hazel Rose Markus have argued that Western selves are constructed as independent from others, and people from many East Asian cultures construct interdependent selves, based on the fundamental relatedness of individuals to each other. These differently constructed selves deeply affect how people see the world, how they experience emotions, how they organize their experience, and what they value.

== Research Areas ==
Shinobu Kitayama is widely recognized as a pioneering figure in cultural psychology, particularly for examining how culture shapes psychological processes. His research spans multiple domains, including:

- Self and identity
- Emotion and emotional experience
- Cognition and attention
- Neuroscience of cultural differences
- Implicit attitudes and motivation
- Holistic vs. analytic cognition

His work investigates how cultural environments “get under the skin,” shaping people’s internal psychological tendencies through socialization.

== Independent vs. Interdependent Self ==
Kitayama, along with Hazel Markus, developed the influential theory that self-construals differ across cultures. Western cultures tend to foster an independent self-construal, emphasizing autonomy, personal preferences, and internal attributes, whereas East Asian cultures promote an interdependent self-construal, emphasizing social harmony, context, and relational obligations.

These differences systematically influence:

- emotional expression
- motivation
- cognitive processing
- self-esteem
- social judgment
- attention to context vs. focal objects

Their framework has become one of the most widely cited in cultural psychology.

== Cultural Differences in Emotion ==
Kitayama' s research demonstrates that emotional experience is profoundly shaped by cultural meaning systems. For example, Americans tend to value high-arousal positive emotions (excitement, enthusiasm), while Japanese individuals tend to value low-arousal positive emotions (calmness, serenity). He showed that:

- emotion regulation strategies differ across cultures
- ideal affect varies across societies
- well-being is interpreted differently depending on cultural norms

== Selected Publications ==
- Markus, H., & Kitayama, S. (1991). Culture and the self: Implications for cognition, emotion, and motivation. Psychological Review, 98, 224-253.
