= Jozef Nuttin =

Belgian psychologist

Jozef Nuttin (1933–2014) was a Belgian psychologist who discovered the name-letter effect, the strong preference people have for letters in their own name. The idea for the psychological experiment to assess if there is an effect came to him in around 1978 when he noticed he liked car license plates that contained letters of his name. He was a scientist working for the Laboratorium for Experimental Psychology, Katholieke Universiteit Leuven in Belgium, a lab he had founded in 1963. In 1985 he published his name-letter research. He and others have since found the effect independent of language. After a few years of relative obscurity, this effect is now used in psychological tests as a measure of implicit self-esteem. Nuttin died in 2014.

== Sources ==
- Hoorens, Vera (2014). "What's really in a name-letter effect? Name-letter preferences as indirect measures of self-esteem". European Review of Social Psychology. 25 (1): 228–262. doi:10.1080/10463283.2014.980085. S2CID 144292531.
- Nuttin, J.M. (1985). "Narcissism beyond Gestalt and awareness: The name–letter effect". European Journal of Social Psychology. 15 (3): 353–361. doi:10.1002/ejsp.2420150309.
- Baumeister, Roy (2007). Encyclopedia of Social Psychology. Sage Publications. ISBN 9781412916707.
- Emeritiforum KU Leuven (2014). "In memoriam".
- Psychology. "Jozef M. Nuttin".
