= Implicit egotism =

Psychological theory

Implicit egotism is the hypothesis that humans have an unconscious preference for things they associate with themselves.

== Pelham, Mirenberg and Jones ==
In a 2002 paper, psychologists Pelham, Mirenberg, and Jones argue that people have a basic desire to feel good about themselves and behave according to that desire. These automatic positive associations would influence feelings about almost anything associated with the self. Based on the mere ownership effect, which states that people like things more if they own them, and the name-letter effect, which states that people like the letters of their name more than other letters, the authors theorised that people would develop an affection for objects and concepts that are chronically associated with the self, such as their name. They called this putative form of unconscious attraction 'implicit egotism'.

Implicit egotism is used by some researchers as an explanation for putative psychological effects such as nominative determinism – the hypothesis that people tend to gravitate towards areas of work that fit their names (e.g. the notion that Igor Judge became a judge because of his name).

== Uri Simonsohn ==
Uri Simonsohn subsequently suggested that implicit egotism only applies to cases where people are nearly indifferent between options, and therefore it would not apply to major decisions such as career choices. Low-stakes decisions such as choosing a charity would show an effect. Raymond Smeets theorised that if implicit egotism stems from a positive evaluation of the self, then people with low self-esteem would not gravitate towards choices associated with the self, but possibly away from them (a laboratory experiment was cited in support of this hypothesis).

In a paper published in 2011, reporting a reanalysis of data from previous population studies, Simonsohn concluded that despite the existence of apparent correlations "all [the] existing evidence appears to be spurious." He criticized Pelham and his colleagues for not considering confounding factors in their data analyses, and pointed out that reverse causality could also help explain several of the correlations. However, Pelham and colleagues had already addressed these criticism in some of their previous papers, including a paper on preferences for close relationship partners led by John Jones. Pelham and Carvallo also published a new, population-level study in 2015. In this study, they controlled for gender, ethnicity, and education levels. In three studies -- looking at both 1880 and 1940 U.S. Census data as well as 1911 English Census data -- they found consistent evidence of people disproportionately working in eleven occupations whose titles matched their surnames (namely, baker, barber, butcher, butler, carpenter, farmer, foreman, mason, miner, painter, and porter). This study also showed that people may be disproportionately likely to marry others who share either their birthday numbers or their birth months. Pelham and Carvallo argued that "natural experiments" such as this may attenuate confounders that Simonsohn claimed were potentially applicable to past studies of implicit egotism. They suggest that a tendency to develop strong preferences for things that resemble the self may be explained by well-established psychological processes such as mere exposure and classical conditioning.

== See also ==
- Self-evaluation maintenance theory
- Implicit self-esteem
