= Victorian People =

1955 book by Asa Briggs

Victorian People: A Reassessment of Persons and Themes, 1851-1867
- Author: Asa Briggs
- Language: English
- Genre: Non-fiction
- Publication date: 1955

Victorian People: A Reassessment of Persons and Themes, 1851-1867 is a book by the historian Asa Briggs originally published in 1955. It is part of a trilogy that also incorporates Victorian Cities and Victorian Things.

== Content ==
Briggs's analysis spans a relatively short part of the Victorian era, encompassing the period between the Great Exhibition of 1851 and the passage of the Reform Act 1867. In particular he focuses upon the involvement of key individuals in the policies and cultural developments of the time. He argues that the period in question was one that had traditionally suffered from a lack of historical scholarship and was interesting in its own right, being the high-Victorian stage marked by a focus upon 'thought', 'work' and 'progress' and a belief in British institutions after the negotiation of the cataclysms and challenges of 1848.

The chapters are as follows:

1. Introduction
2. The Crystal Palace and the Men of 1851
3. John Arthur Roebuck and the Crimean War
4. Trollope, Bagehot, and the English Constitution
5. Samuel Smiles and the Gospel of Work
6. Thomas Hughes and the Public Schools
7. Robert Applegarth and the Trade-Unions
8. John Bright and the Creed of Reform
9. Robert Lowe and the Fear of Democracy
10. Benjamin Disraeli and the Leap in the Dark
11. Epilogue
