= Joanna Spicer =

British television executive

Joanna Spicer CBE
- BBC portrait
- Born: Joanna Ravenscroft Spicer; 29 April 1906; St Albans
- Died: 17 March 1992 (aged 85); Charing Cross Hospital
- Education: Somerville College, Oxford
- Occupation: Television executive
- Employer: BBC
- Known for: back office BBC executive
- Spouse: Robert Henry Scanes Spicer

Joanna Ravenscroft Spicer CBE born Joanna Gibbon (29 April 1906 – 17 March 1992) was a British television executive employed by the BBC. Described by the Oxford Dictionary of National Biography as "virtually unknown", she was involved with discussions leading to Doctor Who and Civilisation. It was said that she "ran BBC Television single handed".

== Life ==
Spicer was born in St Albans in 1906. Her parents were Alice Mary (née Smith) and Andrew Owen Gibbon. She gained a place at Somerville College in Oxford after attending St Paul's Girls' School. She studied history and, after graduating with a second class degree, she stayed for an extra year to gain a post graduate qualification in education.

She married in 1937 and two years later she found work in the broadcasting section of the Ministry of Information. At that time the BBC was extending its services and she moved there in 1941.

She was involved in an emerging technology. The ability to record television would transform its creation, but the new technology created management problems. In June 1953, Spicer had to inform Rudolph Cartier, producer of The Quatermass Experiment, that it was not possible to record trailers using the programme's actors as the agreement with the actor's union Equity then only allowed for live performances.

Spicer became the assistant controller of planning at the BBC and was one of those who backed the idea of creating a science fiction series for Saturday evenings. This resulted in Doctor Who. The BBC credit Spicer as being the main proponent of it being initially based at Lime Grove Studios in Shepherd's Bush. It was her role to decide which BBC department would be given the necessary resources to make programmes. The demand was much higher than the supply and she controlled who would have priority. In 1974, she was promoted from being an OBE to a CBE.

An important conversation she had with David Attenborough, then controller of BBC2, was her suggestion that documentaries should be made to exploit the introduction of colour television to the UK. This led in time to the Civilisation television series.

When she reached the retirement age at the BBC (in 1966), unusually for the time, her contract was renewed. She was offered a lucrative position as independent television's representative at Eurovision, but the BBC wanted to retain her expertise. She eventually retired from the BBC in 1973, but still had the compulsion to work. Spicer spent a decade working with historian Asa Briggs who wrote a multi-volume history of broadcasting in the UK. He had been surprised to find that an important figure like Spicer was not in Who's Who. Between them, they documented the emergence and resulting competition that resulted as independent television was allowed in the UK. Their work together resulted in the 1986 book The Franchise Affair.

Spicer died in Charing Cross Hospital. She was described as BBC Television’s top programme planner and that she "ran BBC Television single handed." Holding, as she did, a key job during an important time in the history of British television, the veteran broadcaster David Dimbleby described her over 30 years after her death as a “great woman” who “today would be Director-General”, although Monica Sims, former head of children’s programmes, has spoken regretfully of what she saw as Spicer’s preference for promoting the careers of “beautiful young men”
