= Name-letter effect =

Tendency of people to prefer the letters in their name over other letters in the alphabet

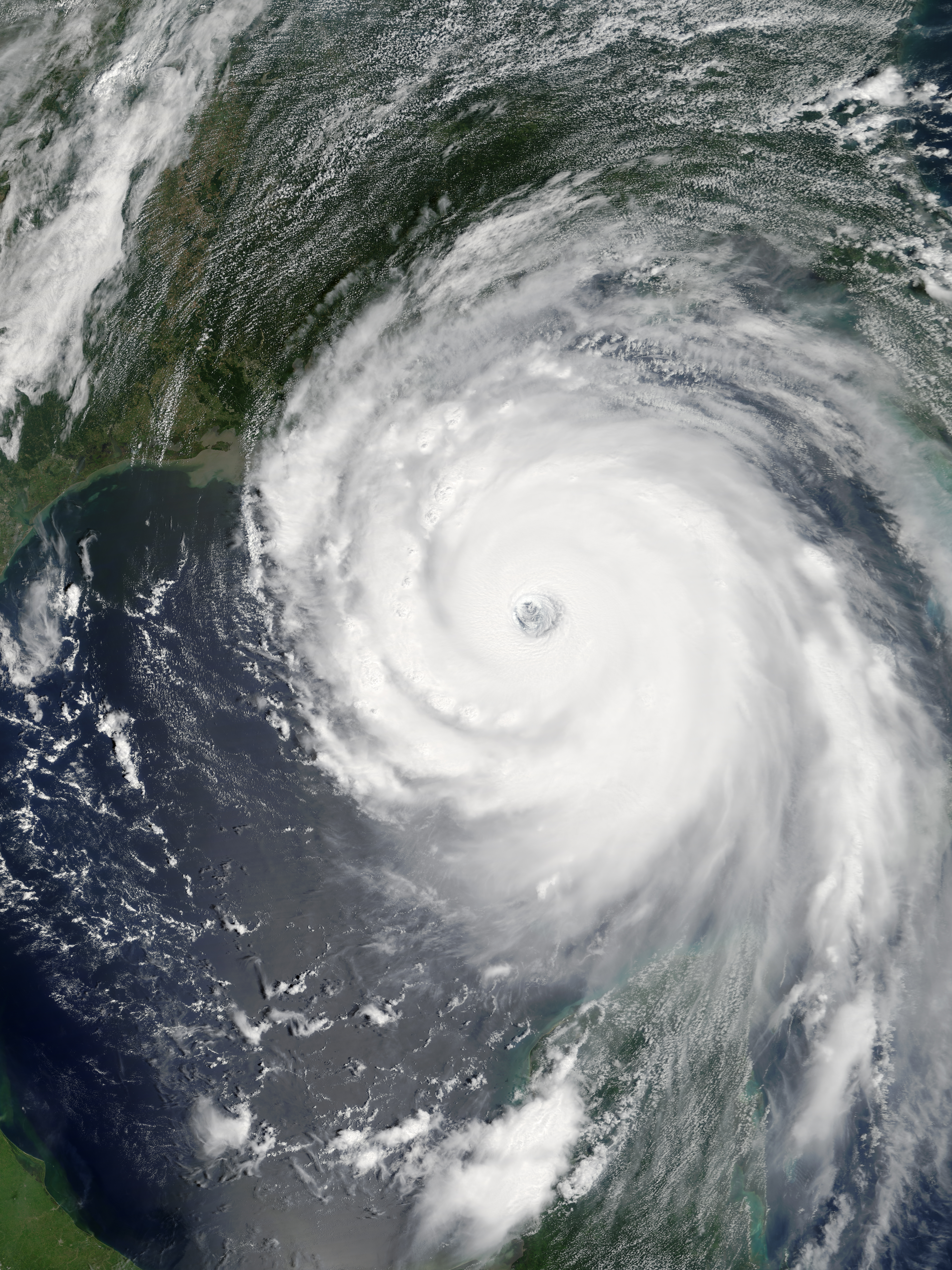
Hurricane Katrina: people with the initial K especially donated to the disaster relief.

The name-letter effect is the tendency of people to prefer the letters in their name over other letters in the alphabet. Whether subjects are asked to rank all letters of the alphabet, rate each of the letters, choose the letter they prefer out of a set of two, or pick a small set of letters they most prefer, on average people consistently like the letters in their own name the most. Crucially, subjects are not aware that they are choosing letters from their name.

Discovered in 1985 by the Belgian psychologist Jozef Nuttin, the name-letter effect has been replicated in dozens of studies, involving subjects from over 15 countries, using four different alphabets. It holds across age and gender. People who changed their names many years ago tend to prefer the letters of both their current and original names over non-name letters. The effect is most prominent for initials, but even when initials are excluded, the remaining letters of both given and family names still tend to be preferred over non-name letters.

Most people like themselves; the name is associated with the self, and hence the letters of the name are preferred, despite the fact that they appear in many other words. People who do not like themselves tend not to exhibit the name-letter effect. A similar effect has been found for numbers related to birthdays: people tend to prefer the number signifying the day of the month on which they were born. Alternative explanations for the name-letter effect, such as frequent exposure and early mastery, have been ruled out. In psychological assessments, the Name Letter Preference Task is widely used to estimate implicit self-esteem.

There is some evidence that the effect has implications for real-life decisions. In the lab, people disproportionately favor brands matching their initials. An analysis of a large database of charity donations revealed that a disproportionately large number of people donate to disaster relief following hurricanes with names sharing their initial letter (e.g. Kate and Kevin following Hurricane Katrina). Studies that investigate the impact of name-letter matching on bigger life decisions (where to live, whom to marry, which occupation to take on) are controversial.

== Background ==
Systematic interest in the letter preference began in 1959 with brand-preference studies by researchers Mecherikoff and Horton. These tried to find the relative appeal of letters for use in package labels. In an extension of the studies, subjects were asked to rank the English alphabet by the pleasantness of the appearance of capital letters. While there was not a great deal of agreement amongst the subjects (the coefficients of concordance were low), a strong positive correlation was found between a letter's average rank and how frequently it occurred as an initial letter of family names.

Robert Zajonc, a social psychologist, published research in 1968 into preferences between pairs of words (e.g. "on" or "off"): in the overwhelming majority of trials the preferred word was also the most common. Zajonc also tested preferences for nonsense words and found that people liked them the more they heard them. He interpreted these results as evidence that mere repeated exposure to a stimulus is sufficient to enhance its attractiveness.

Around 1977, Belgian experimental psychologist Jozef Nuttin was driving on a highway looking at license plates when he noticed that he preferred plates containing letters from his own name. He wondered if people in general would prefer stimuli that are somehow connected to them; a "mere belongingness" as opposed to Zajonc's mere exposure.

== First study ==
In his lab at the Katholieke Universiteit Leuven, Nuttin designed experiments to test the hypothesis that people place a higher value on letters that feature in their name. It was crucial to the experimental design to rule out other factors, particularly mere exposure. If letters in a name are also letters that occur with higher frequency, then a preference for one's own letters might arise from the mere-exposure effect.

=== Method ===
First 11 stimuli for a yoke
| Irma Maes | | Jef Jacobs | |
|---|---|---|---|
| A | U | A | U |
| M | D | M | D |
| T | R | T | R |
| I | G | I | G |
| V | S | V | S |
| E | N | E | N |
| A | P | A | P |
| L | M | L | M |
| H | F | H | F |
| E | I | E | I |
| J | K | J | K |

To find an effect which ruled out mere exposure, Nuttin created a yoked control design in which two subjects evaluated the same letters separately. Some of the letters belonged to one subject's name, and some of the letters belonged to the other subject's name, while some were random. In this design, any difference in preference between subjects would have to be based on whether the letter occurred in their name.

For example, take the fictitious pair Irma Maes and Jef Jacobs as shown in the table. The first stimulus is A and U: the last letter of Irma's first name and a letter not in her name. The next stimulus is M and D: the penultimate letter from Irma's first name and a letter not part of her name. As can be seen in the table this is repeated for the remaining letters of Irma's first name. The letters of her last name then also appear in reverse order, and finally the letters of both of Jef's names. The shading in the table reveals the pattern hidden to subjects, who would have been told to circle their preferred letter of each pair as fast as possible without thinking.

In the first trial, 38 Dutch-speaking local elementary school girls circled the letters they preferred in two yoked lists of letter pairs. A significant preference for the letters of one's own name over those of the other person was found. The second experiment used 98 Dutch-speaking local university students, to see if more years of reading made a difference. Four other factors were varied: either pairs or triads of letters; encircling the preferred letter or crossing out the less preferred ones; the letters QXYZ, infrequent in Dutch, included or excluded; own-name letters presented first or last. All conditions gave a name-letter effect, with a stronger effect when QXYZ were included and the less preferred letter was crossed out. No significant difference was found using family name rather than first name or both names. While the effect was strongest for initials, subsequent data analysis revealed a significant effect even without the first and last initials.

=== Discussion ===
Nuttin concluded that the experiments showed that, independent of visual, acoustical, aesthetic, semantic, and frequency characteristics, letters belonging to one's own first and family names are preferred above other letters. He framed the effect in the context of narcissism, Gestalt theory and awareness, as reflected in the title of his 1985 article "Narcissism beyond Gestalt and awareness: the name letter effect", in which "beyond Gestalt" refers to the fact that subjects were not shown names, only letters in isolation, and "beyond awareness" to the fact that subjects did not realize that the letters of their own names were used. Nuttin claimed the effect he found was the first to go beyond Gestalt and awareness.

== Second study ==
In 1987 Nuttin published his second study, describing experiments done in 1984 and 1985 with the help of Hilde Sas. Because of the far-reaching implications of the name-letter effect for psychological theories, Nuttin found it wise to first test the effect's generality and robustness, before setting off on a research program aimed at understanding the underlying affective and cognitive processes at work. He wondered whether the effect would be found in all cultural and linguistic communities, or whether the first study revealed an effect due to some unknown idiosyncratic aspect of the Dutch language in Belgium.

=== Method ===
Cross-lingual studies were performed at 13 European universities, using 12 different languages, viz. Dutch, English, Finnish, French, German, Greek (the only one with a non-Roman alphabet), Hungarian, Italian, Norwegian, Polish, Portuguese, and Spanish. Because the original yoked design did not lend itself well to long-distance research and standardization, it was replaced by a simpler, easier to replicate experimental design. Subjects were asked to mark the six capital letters they liked most in a randomized list containing all letters of the local alphabet, again without giving it much thought. They had to mark their first preference with 1, their second with 2, etc. The new method was first applied in Belgium. When results showed the name-letter effect at work again, it was copied in the other countries. A total of 2,047 subjects participated, all students.

=== Discussion ===
Across languages and letters, the average probability of a letter being chosen as one of the six preferred letters was 0.30 for name letters and 0.20 for other letters. The strongest effects were observed in the Norwegian and Finnish studies. In the Hungarian, Portuguese, and Italian studies the effect was present but not to a significant degree. The effect was also found when only looking at letters in family names, as well as only first name letters. The name-letter effect emerged as very significant in all languages when only initials were considered. There was a probability of 0.46 that initial letters were chosen amongst the top-six letters. Further analysis revealed that the overall name-letter effect is not simply due to initials: when excluding initials a name-letter effect was still found across all languages.

Nuttin analyzed the data to see if there was a national-letter effect, but failed to find one. Norwegians did not favor the letter N (for Norge) more than people from other countries did, neither did the Hungarians favor the letter M (for Magyarország). This led Nuttin to conclude that individual ownership has affective consequences that are not observed for collective ownership.

The data also allowed for an investigation into whether visual prominence is an important factor in the name-letter effect. Cars in Austria and Hungary have a sticker displaying their nationality with a capital letter that does not match the country's name in the local language (A and H respectively). This did not have any impact on people in those countries liking those letters relatively more.

As in the first study, the second one also included a task relating to disliking letters. Subjects were asked to select the six letters they liked the least. As before, merely having a letter in one's own name significantly reduced the chances of disliking it. This task revealed an asymmetry in the letter preference hierarchy. While there was a large consensus within each of the 12 languages as to which letters were least preferred, there was not much consensus at all around the most preferred letters. (Note: This asymmetry is similar to what Czapiński found when analyzing school-trip companion preferences: much consensus as to who were the three least preferred students, but little in who were the three most preferred.)

== Reception ==
In the light of how surprising the finding was, Nuttin hesitated for seven years before finally going public with it. He first mentioned it at a conference of the European Association of Experimental Social Psychology in 1984, followed by the 1985 and 1987 articles referred to above. His work was met with widespread skepticism, as he had expected. Loosen, a researcher at Nuttin's own university, called the name-letter effect "so strange that a down-to-earth researcher will spontaneously think of an artifact". (Note: Loosen's critique stemmed from misinterpreting Nuttin's experimental design. Loosen thought that subjects in the yoked experiments were randomly selected to form a pair. However, this had not been the case. Nuttin had selected pairs based on minimal overlap of syllables in the subjects' names.) Other researchers did not explicitly say that the effect was spurious, but they doubted its psychological relevance. In the first five years after publication (1985–1989), Nuttin's 1985 article was cited only once and the effect was studied at only one other university (Ohio State University, where Johnson replicated the effect using American students). (Note: Because the effect is most profound for initials, Johnson had christened the effect the initial-letter effect. Nuttin did not agree with this reductionism, saying there is no need to create the illusion of two phenomena where there is only one.)

This all changed in 1995, when Greenwald and Banaji pointed out that Nuttin's work was relevant to indirect measurement of self-esteem, which Nuttin himself had actually already suggested. After that the original study was cited 14 times in the five years between 1995 and 1999, 50 times between 2000 and 2004, 114 times between 2005 and 2009, and approximately 200 times between 2010 and 2014. The name-letter effect is no longer disputed and Nuttin's work has been called "seminal" by Stieger, Voracek, and Formann in their 2012 meta-analysis of 44 publications on the effect. Their meta-analysis found no trace of publication bias.

== Characteristics ==
In her 2014 meta-analysis of dozens of name-letter effect studies, Hoorens called the effect robust. She noted robustness in:

- Scope: The name-letter effect is stronger for initials than for non-initials, but generally still holds even when excluding initials from analysis. (Note: Koole, Smeets, van Knippenberg, and Dijksterhuis found an effect only for initials, not for letters in other positions.)
- Gender: All but two studies found the effect equally strong for women and men. (Note: The exceptions are a study by Albers, Rotteveel, and Dijksterhuis, and one by Stieger, Preyss, and Voracek.) (Note: Gender-role orientation, the extent to which an individual adopts and displays traits, attitudes, and behaviors normatively identified as male-typical or female-typical, may also play a part in the name-letter effect. It can be measured by the gender initial-preference task, which requires participants to rate letters for their gender typicality. Men have been shown to rate their initial letters as more male-typical, whereas women rate their initials as more female-typical.)
- Age: The effect has been found in people ranging from school children to university students, middle-aged and old-aged adults. (Note: The only known exception is a study by Kernis, Lakey, and Heppner.)
- Culture: Although there are many differences between Eastern and Western cultures, including as to how often family names or initials are used, the effect seems to apply across cultures. In their study with subjects from Thailand, where the family name is rarely used, Hoorens, Nuttin, Herman and Pavakanun found a much stronger effect for first name than family name. Kitayama and Karasawa found no special effect for initials in Japan, where name initials are rarely used, but did find an overall name-letter effect.
- Language: 15 languages have been tested (Bulgarian, Dutch, English, Finnish, French, German, Greek, Hungarian, Italian, Japanese, Norwegian, Polish, Portuguese, Spanish, Thai), covering four language families (Indo-European, Uralic, Sino-Tibetan, Japonic) and five alphabets (Greek, Roman, Cyrillic, Devanagari, Kana). In all cases a name-letter effect was found.
- Time: In a study on preferences for initials, Stieger and LeBel found that people who had changed their name after marrying continued to show a preference for the initial of their abandoned birth name decades into their marriage. Also, subjects who had been married less than two years already showed a name-letter effect for their new last name initial.

== Explanations ==
Various explanations for the name-letter effect have been explored. Several explanations which seemed plausible at first have since been rejected.

=== Disproved causes ===
==== Mere exposure ====
People may simply like most what they see most. Letters that appear more frequently in everyday usage also occur more often in people's names. Forer, in 1940, and Alluisi and Adams, in 1962, found a positive correlation between the frequency of occurrence of letters and phonemes and how attractive they were judged to be. Zajonc extended these studies, using foreign symbols and controlling the number of exposures. This led him to formulate the mere-exposure hypothesis: the more something is seen, the more it is liked. Nuttin's original study showed that mere exposure can not be the cause of the name-letter effect, as letters with equal frequency were evaluated differently by people who had the letter in their names and those who did not. (Note: Nuttin made the assumption that for any given letter, total exposure has been roughly the same for each subject. That is, an adult's name is read or written infrequently compared to all other words. Other researchers agreed; Greenwald and Banaji spoke of "reaching an asymptote".) He also found that whereas the letter B is of low frequency in French and the letter Q of medium frequency, in experiments with French speakers the B was among the most highly liked letters and the Q was among the least liked. Similarly, in Polish the Y is a medium frequency letter, yet was still among the least preferred letters. In each of the languages, the least frequent letters were over-represented in the set of least preferred letters, whereas the most preferred letters were rarely the highest frequency letters. The exposure counts in the lab studies done by Zajonc (20 to 25 times) were minuscule compared to real-life observation counts of any letter, which also caused Nuttin to cast doubt on whether Zajonc's theory could hold true in the real world.

==== Subjective frequency ====
Subjective frequency is how frequently subjects think a stimulus appears. Name letters may be noticed more and, consequently, assumed to occur more frequently than other letters. Early research into the impact of exposure showed that differences in subjective frequency yielded different results even when the actual frequency was identical. Hoorens and Nuttin tested whether subjective frequency could be an explanation for the name-letter effect by asking subjects to rank-order the entire alphabet twice, once according to their letter preference and once according to estimated letter frequency. Subjects indeed significantly overestimated the frequency of letters in their names, although there was no significant positive correlation between the overestimation of frequency and the name-letter effect. The researchers also asked subjects to rate how much they liked their own name. Subjects who liked their name had a stronger name-letter effect than those who did not like their name, but they did not overestimate the frequency of own-name letters more than subjects who did not like their names. Hoorens and Nuttin concluded that there is no support for the subjective frequency hypothesis.

==== Evaluative conditioning ====
Evaluative conditioning suggests that if the name is liked then the name letters will be liked too. This would occur through repeated visual association of the name letters with the name. Martin and Levey defined evaluative conditioning as a variation of classical conditioning in which we come to like or dislike something through an association. Given the observation that our own name stands out among others as quite an attractive stimulus, as Cherry found in the cocktail party effect, it could be that the name-letter effect results from evaluative conditioning. Feys set up a controlled study with Flemish subjects, pairing unfamiliar symbols (Japanese kanji) with subjects' own names, and with other names. He found that there was no difference in how much subjects liked the kanji symbol representing their own name or other names. He concluded that evaluative conditioning is not the primary cause of the name-letter effect.

==== Subjective ownership ====
Subjective ownership would occur if subjects knowingly chose the letters from their own name. Nuttin ruled out a conscious response strategy in tests. Despite being given a monetary reward and unlimited time, none of the subjects of his original study were able to find a pattern in the stimulus lists, ruling out the possibility that they knew their own name-letters were there.

==== Mastery pleasure ====
The letters first learned by a child, commonly their own name, may come to have lasting positive associations. Hoorens and Todorova tested this by looking for a name-letter effect in bilingual subjects where their mother tongue alphabet was Cyrillic and their foreign-language alphabet Roman. Because learning a foreign language at a later age does not typically involve extra attention given to name letters, there should be no name-letter effect in the foreign-language alphabet, only in the first-language alphabet. Results of a study with 100 Bulgarian subjects who at a later age learned English, German, French or Spanish revealed a name-letter effect for the Roman alphabet as well as for Cyrillic. (Note: The effect was not due to the two alphabets sharing letters. It was found for common letters with identical pronunciation (AEKMT), common letters with different pronunciation (BCFPYU), and Roman capitals not appearing in Cyrillic (DFGIJNRVWZ).) The researchers concluded mastery pleasure is not the principal cause of the name-letter effect. In a follow-up study Hoorens, Nuttin, Herman and Pavakanun tested the strength of the name-letter effect among elementary-school children, in a cross-sectional experimental design involving Flemish and Hungarian second, fourth, and sixth graders. Instead of finding the name-effect to decrease with age as might be expected, they found it increased, thus proving that mastery pleasure is not the principal cause. (Note: Other studies have since also found the effect to increase over age, for instance, Corenblum and Armstrong in their study of Native Canadian children.) They also investigated name-letter effects in bilingual Thai subjects, some of whom had learned the English alphabet at the same time as the Thai alphabet, and others who had learned it later. (Note: Only Thai consonants were presented as stimuli. Thai vowels can not be used in isolation as their sound depends on their context.) They found that the time at which students had learned the second alphabet made no difference in the strength of the name-letter effect, thereby ruling out mastery pleasure as a co-determinant.

=== Probable cause ===
The effect is thought to arise from unconscious, automatic processes of self-evaluation, with different research groups coming at it from two different angles.

==== Mere ownership ====
Nuttin frames the cause in terms of ownership, which has roots in economic psychology. The endowment effect has found that people ascribe more value to things merely because they own them. Nuttin puts the name-letter effect down to people automatically liking and valuing anything that is connected to them. As such, the name-letter effect is just one example of a more general mere-ownership effect. In which case, various verifiable predictions follow.

- Most people should like their name. Those that do not should not like their name letters. Hoorens and Nuttin tested this and found that most people rated their name relatively highly. They also found that subjects who evaluated their own name relatively positively liked their name letters more than subjects who evaluated their own name negatively.
- Bilinguals using two different alphabets should demonstrate a name-letter effect in both alphabets. A weaker effect should be found in the second alphabet, as names in second alphabets are likely to be less connected to the self. Hoorens and Todorova found that bilinguals with a tendency to like their name letters in Cyrillic also had a tendency to like their name letters in the Roman alphabet. The effect was found to be weaker in the second alphabet. This was replicated in a Thai-English study by Hoorens, Nuttin, Herman and Pavakanun.
- Similar effects should be found for other attributes connected to the self, such as the numbers of one's birthday. Nickell, Pederson, and Rossow found that people like the numbers representing the month and year of their birth more. They also found that subjects liked the year of their graduation more. In a study of Japanese students, Kitayama and Karasawa found a strong birthday-number effect for the day of the month, especially for numbers higher than 12. The higher numbers may be more uniquely associated with birthdays, whereas lower numbers could be more saturated with other meanings.

==== Implicit self-esteem ====
Another group of researchers has framed the cause in terms of social psychology, specifically the self-esteem theory. Beginning with Greenwald and Banaji in 1995, this group states that the name-letter effect results from implicit self-esteem, a person's tendency to evaluate him or herself positively in a spontaneous, automatic, or unconscious manner. Most people like themselves. The halo effect of self-esteem spreads to any attributes associated with the self, including the name and its letters. As early as 1926 Syz discovered that a person's own name is special compared to others, eliciting physical responses measurable on the skin. It is thought that when a person recognizes the letters in his or her name, that person experiences positive feelings of implicit self-esteem. These positive feelings induce subjects to unknowingly select the letters of their own name, producing the name-letter effect.

- To be an automatic process, the effect should, for each specific person, be fairly stable over time. Koole, Dijksterhuis and Van Knippenberg investigated this by asking Dutch students to rate each letter of the alphabet, together with some filler questions for distraction, twice within a four-week period. They found that preferences for name letters did not significantly change between the first and second rating. Hoorens and colleagues also found that ratings remained stable when 164 subjects rated letters seven days in a row.
- To be an automatic process, the effect should, like other automatic processes involving preferences, be influenced by deliberate thought. Multiple studies have shown that thinking about feelings inhibits automatic responding. Koole, Dijksterhuis, and van Knippenberg had subjects give their preferences for letters and numbers 1 to 50. They made half of them explain their preferences. They found a name-letter effect and birthday-number effect in those subjects asked to answer without thinking, but no effects in those asked to think. This points to the effect being the result of an automatic process.
- Unconscious self-regulation has been found to increase under psychological threat. For the effect to be one of unconscious self-regulation it too should increase under threat. Jones, Pelham, Mirenberg, and Hetts found that when people who were high in explicit self-esteem were exposed to a psychological threat, they showed exaggerated name-letter preferences. In contrast, low self-esteem participants showed evidence of the opposite tendency. Komori and Murata later replicated this response to threat with Japanese bilinguals who were asked to select preferred letters of the English alphabet.
- If the effect is an automatic process, then the subliminal use of name letters should influence other preferences. Wentura, Kulfanek, and Greve investigated this by the use of a priming technique. They showed subjects the first and last initials of their own name or of a yoked subject's name, too briefly to be noticed. This was immediately followed by words such as "honest" and "lonely". Subjects had to quickly identify the word they had seen as positive or negative. It was found that subjects categorized positive words more quickly if they were first primed with their own initials. There was no effect for negative words. The effects of initial-letter priming were especially strong for subjects with high levels of explicit self-esteem.
- If there is a halo effect spreading to anything connected to the self, then people in relationships should like the name letters of their partners more than other letters. LeBel and Campbell tested this and found a name-letter effect for initials of subjects' partners. DeHart, Pelham, Fiedorowicz, Carvallo, and Gabriel concluded that the effect applies to parent-child, sibling and friendship relationships as well.

== Application ==
In psychological assessments, the name-letter effect has been exploited to measure self-esteem. There are two types of self-esteem: explicit self-esteem (a person's deliberate and conscious evaluation of themselves) and implicit self-esteem. Because by definition implicit self-esteem is not accessible to introspection, measures of it do not rely on direct self-reports but on the degree to which objects associated with the self generate positive versus negative thoughts.

The Letter Preference Task is the second-most popular method to measure implicit self-esteem, surpassed only by the Implicit Association Test. The task has also been called the Name Letter Preference Task, Name-Letter-Ratings Measure, and Initial Preference Task. There is no standard method for applying the task. The most commonly used one is a letter rating task, which involves having participants judge all the letters of the alphabet. Even within this method there are variations in the instructions (how much you like the letters or how attractive you find them), in the rating scales (five-point, seven-point, or nine-point), in the order of the letters (random or alphabetical), and in data collection (paper-and-pencil or computer-based).

There is no standard algorithm for calculating implicit self-esteem. At least six algorithms are in use. In their meta-analysis of the name-letter effect, Stieger, Voracek, and Formann recommend using the ipsatized double-correction algorithm (the so-called "I-algorithm"), as originally recommended and named by LeBel and Gawronski). In her meta-analysis, Hoorens does not recommend a specific algorithm as little is known about how name-letter preference scores obtained from different algorithms relate to the most important psychometric quality of all, validity. The algorithms are typically applied to initials only, but can be used for all name letters.

Stieger, Voracek, and Formann recommend that the task be administered twice, that the effects be calculated separately for first-name initial and last-name initial, that the task be accompanied with the birthday-number task, and that the instructions focus on liking rather than attractiveness. They suggest it may be useful to use not just initials but all name letters for measuring implicit self-esteem, something which Hoorens says is her most important recommendation. The Letter Preference Task has been used to measure implicit self-esteem in contexts as diverse as depression, physical health, social acceptance, unrealistic optimism, feedback sensitivity, self-regulation, and defensiveness.

== Wider implications ==
Researchers have looked for wider implications of the name-letter effect on preferences, both inside and outside the lab.

=== In the lab ===
In controlled studies in the lab, Hodson and Olson tried to find evidence of people liking everyday things (e.g. foods, animals) that matched their name initials. No evidence was found, neither for a between-subjects effect (e.g. Judy did not like things starting with J, such as jam, more than Doug liked things starting with J), nor for a within-individuals effect (e.g. Judy did not like jam more than honey). The researchers did discover a small but reliable effect of initials on brand-name preferences within individuals (e.g. Hank did like Honda more than non-matching brands). They speculated that brand names are more likely to communicate identity to others than other everyday things. Stieger extended this research by looking at buying preferences for product names. He found that people were disproportionately more likely to buy products matching their initials. The effect mainly occurred for big brands. No correlation was found between the strength of an individual's name-letter effect and the strength of his or her name-letter-branding effect.

Wiebenga and Fennis investigated whether the use of the personal pronouns "I" and "my" in branding also had an effect on preferences, given the way these pronouns link to the self. They found that brand names with a generic self-referencing pronoun (e.g. iPhone, Myspace) were evaluated more positively than non-self-referencing brand names (e.g. Xbox). The effect behaved like the name-letter effect: when the self was put under threat the effect became stronger, and it disappeared for people with negative self-evaluations.

A study by Polman, Pollmann, and Poehlman found that sharing initials with members in a group can increase the quality of group work. In a study of undergraduate students they found that groups sharing initials performed better than groups that did not. Groups that had a higher proportion of shared initials exceeded groups with a lower proportion of shared initials.

=== Outside the lab ===
==== Controversial studies ====
Researchers have looked for evidence of the driving force behind the name-letter effect outside the lab. A body of controversial research under the umbrella of implicit egotism, starting with Pelham, Mirenberg, and Jones, has investigated whether people unknowingly make life decisions based on their name letters or name. Sceptics say that a claim that name letters influence life decisions is an extraordinary claim that requires extraordinary evidence.

Simonsohn urged researchers to look hard for confounding variables in field data analysis. An example of a confounding variable is baby-name popularity. This has fluctuated significantly over the decades. Simonsohn found that although Walter and Dennis are of near-identical popularity in a large sample of US first names of living people, Walter is a relatively old-fashioned name. He suggested that when Pelham et al. found a disproportionately high number of dentists whose name started with the letters "Den" compared to with "Wal", they had overlooked that people named Walter would tend to be old, and more likely to be retired. Baby-name fluctuation seemed a better explanation for disproportionately more "Den" dentists than "Wal" than implicit egotism. Using both a different data set (Twitter and Google+ accounts) and a different statistical analysis, Kooti, Magno, and Weber found no evidence of people disproportionately having a job matching their name initials. (Note: Overlooking a cohort confound was also the problem with controversial research that tied initials to death. Christenfeld, Phillips, and Glynn concluded that people who have positive monograms (e.g. ACE or VIP) live significantly longer than those with negative initials (e.g. PIG or DIE). This conclusion was based on analysis of thousands of California death certificates between 1969 and 1995. Morrison and Smith subsequently pointed out that this was an artefact of grouping data by age at death. Frequency of initials changing over time could be a confounding variable. When they grouped the same data by birth year, they found no statistically significant relationship between initials and longevity. Similarly, Smith found statistical errors had led Abel and Kruger wrongly to conclude that Major League Baseball players whose names have positive initials live longer than players with negative initials.)

Dyjas, Grasman, Wetzels, van der Maas, and Wagenmakers criticized the method Pelham et al. used in their analysis of archives of deaths in 23 "Saint cities" in the US, such as St. Louis and St. Paul. Whereas Pelham et al. pooled all data together and concluded that people gravitate towards cities matching their first name (e.g. Louis or Paul), Dyjas et al. used Bayesian hierarchical modelling to show that there are several cities where the opposite happens, people moving away from their name Saint city. They concluded that there is no evidence for an overall effect. A different set of cities containing 30 surnames, such as Jackson and Johnson City, did reveal a disproportionately large number of deceased people with city–surname matches. Dyjas et al. disputed that people gravitate towards cities of their surname, but instead cited Simonsohn's argument that many descendants of founders of these cities may never have moved away, a case of reverse causality.

Simonsohn also raised the possibility of reverse causality in the case of Anseel and Duyck's analysis of a large data set consisting of Belgians' last names and the companies they work for. Anseel and Duyck concluded that people tend to choose to work for companies that match their initial. But Simonsohn suspected that, like Walt Disney working for Disney, many people work for companies named after themselves or a family member. When he controlled for reverse causality in a large US data set, he could not see any evidence for people choosing to work for companies matching their initial.

A few controversial studies have linked performance to initials. However, McCullough and Williams found no evidence of a name-letter effect for the letter 'K' in baseball players striking out (shown on the scoreboard with a 'K'), despite an earlier study by Nelson and Simmons suggesting there was. Nelson and Simmons also found that students with first name initials C or D get lower grades than others with initials A or B. Again, McCullough and Williams criticized the statistical analysis used and found no evidence to support such a relation.

In response to Simonsohn's critical analyses of their earlier methods, Pelham and Carvallo published a new study in 2015, describing how they now controlled for gender, ethnicity, and education confounds. In one study they looked at census data and concluded that men disproportionately worked in eleven occupations that matched their surnames, for example, Baker, Carpenter, and Farmer, something the New Scientist has coined nominative determinism. Voracek, Rieder, Stieger, and Swami investigated which way the arrow of causality points when it comes to names influencing choice of occupation. They reported that today's Smiths still tend to have the physical capabilities of their ancestors who were smiths. In the researchers' view a genetic-social hypothesis appeared more viable than the hypothesis of implicit egotism effects.

==== Undisputed studies ====
Research by Chandler, Griffin, and Sorensen into a link between letter names and donations has been widely accepted. They analyzed the records of disaster relief donations after seven hurricanes (among others, Katrina, Rita and Mitch). They found that people who shared an initial with the hurricane were overrepresented as donors. They concluded that people want to overcome some of the negative feelings associated with the shared name and thus donate. Simonsohn suggested that implicit egotism only applies to cases where people are nearly indifferent between options, and therefore it would not apply to major decisions such as career choices, but would to low-stakes decisions such as choosing a charity.
