= Kentish Note Book =

The Kentish Note Book was a 19th-century magazine about the English county Kent.

It had two issues per year. The magazine had notes, queries and replies on subjects connected to Kent.

An example of a note featured in the note books is given in a May 2000 issue of the New Scientist magazine, in relationship to the suspected psychological effect of nominative determinism, the hypothesis that people gravitate towards areas of work that fit their name. In the Feedback column it refers to a “Note” addressed to the editor of the Kentish Note Book, dated 29 December 1888 and entitled “What’s in a name?”.

"In many cases the name admirably agrees with the occupation or calling of the individual who bears it." The note then goes on to cite examples culled from the Shooters Hill district in the county of Kent: "There are several carriers by the name of Carter; a hosier named Hosegood; an auctioneer named Sales; and a draper named Cuff . . ."
