= Asa Briggs =

English historian (1921–2016)

The Right Honourable The Lord Briggs
- Born: 7 May 1921; Keighley, West Riding of Yorkshire, England
- Died: 15 March 2016 (aged 94); Lewes, East Sussex, England
- Education: Sidney Sussex College, Cambridge; University of London
- Occupation: Historian
- Spouse: Susan Anne Banwell (1955–2016, his death)
- Military career
- Allegiance: United Kingdom
- Branch: Royal Corps of Signals Intelligence Corps
- Service years: 1942–1945
- Rank: Warrant Officer
- Conflicts: Second World War

Member of the House of Lords
- Lord Temporal
- Life peerage 19 July 1976 – 15 March 2016

Asa Briggs, Baron Briggs (7 May 1921 – 15 March 2016) was an English historian. He was a leading specialist on the Victorian era, and the foremost historian of broadcasting in Britain. Briggs achieved international recognition during his long and prolific career for examining various aspects of modern British history. He became a life peer in 1976.

== Early life ==
Asa Briggs was born in Keighley, West Riding of Yorkshire, in 1921 to William Briggs and his wife Jane. William Briggs is described as an engineer and grocer and also served as a Unitarian lay preacher. Asa was educated at Keighley Boys' Grammar School and Sidney Sussex College, Cambridge, graduating with a BA (first class) in history, in 1941, and a BSc in economics (first class) from the University of London External Programme, also in 1941.

== Military service ==
During the Second World War, from 1942 to 1945, Briggs served in the Intelligence Corps and worked at the British wartime signals intelligence station, Bletchley Park. He was a member of "the Watch" in Hut 6, the section deciphering Enigma machine messages from the German Army and Luftwaffe. That posting had arisen because Briggs had played chess at college with Cambridge mathematician Howard Smith (who was to become the director general of MI5 in 1979), and Smith had written to the head of Hut 6, Gordon Welchman, who was also a Cambridge mathematician, recommending Briggs to him.

== Academic career ==
After the war, he was elected a fellow of Worcester College, Oxford (1945–55), and was subsequently appointed university reader in recent social and economic history (1950–55). Whilst a young fellow, Briggs proofread Winston Churchill's A History of the English-Speaking Peoples. He was later faculty fellow of Nuffield College (1953–55) and a member of the Institute for Advanced Study, Princeton, New Jersey, United States (1953–54).

From 1955 until 1961, he was professor of modern history at Leeds University, and between 1961 and 1976 he was professor of history at Sussex University, whilst also serving as dean of the School of Social Studies (1961–65), pro vice-chancellor (1961–67) and vice-chancellor (1967–76). On 4 June 2008, the University of Sussex Arts A1 and A2 lecture theatres, designed by Basil Spence, were renamed in his honour. In 1976, he returned to Oxford to become provost of Worcester College, retiring from the post in 1991.

He was chancellor of the Open University (1978–94) and in May 1979 was awarded an honorary degree as Doctor of the university. He was an honorary fellow of Sidney Sussex College, Cambridge, from 1968; Worcester College, Oxford, from 1969; and St Catharine's College, Cambridge, from 1977. He held a visiting appointment at the Gannett Center for Media Studies at Columbia University in the late 1980s and again at the renamed Freedom Forum Media Studies Center at Columbia in 1995–96. Announced in the 1976 Birthday Honours, he was created a life peer as Baron Briggs, of Lewes in the County of East Sussex on 19 July 1976.

Between 1961 and 1995, Briggs wrote a five-volume series on the history of broadcasting in the UK from 1922 to 1974 – essentially the history of the BBC, which commissioned the work. Briggs' other works ranged from an account of the period that Karl Marx spent in London to the corporate history of British retailer Marks and Spencer. In 1987, Lord Briggs was invited to be president of the Brontë Society, a literary society established in 1893 in Haworth, near Keighley, Yorkshire. He presided over the society's centenary celebrations in 1993 and continued as president until he retired from the position in 1996. He was also president of the William Morris Society from 1978 to 1991 and president of the UK's Victorian Society from 1986 until his death. He served as a governor of the British Film Institute between 1970 and 1977.

Briggs headed the Committee on Nursing government investigation in the early 1970s. The committee's subsequent report became known as the Briggs Report.

== Personal life ==
Briggs married Susan Anne Banwell of Keevil, Wiltshire in 1955; the couple had two sons and two daughters. He died at home in Lewes at the age of 94 on 15 March 2016. Lady Briggs died in 2025.

== Select bibliography ==
- History of Birmingham, 3 volumes (Oxford University Press)

1. Volume II: Borough and City 1865-1938 (1952)

Briggs contributed volume 2 - volume 1 was written by Conrad Gill (1952) and volume 3 by Anthony Sutcliffe and Roger Smith (1974)

- The History of Broadcasting in the United Kingdom, 5 volumes (Oxford University Press)

1. The Birth of Broadcasting (1961)
2. The Golden Age of Wireless - 1927–1939 (1965)
3. The War of Words - 1939–1945 (1970)
4. Sound and Vision - 1945–1955 (1979)
5. Competition - 1955–1974 (1995)

- Victorian People: Reassessments of People, Institutions, Ideas and Events, 1851-1867 (Odhams Press, 1954); reprinted in A Victorian Trilogy (Folio Society, 1996)
- The Age of Improvement, 1783–1867 (Longmans, 1959) from "A History of England" series; reprinted as England in the Age of Improvement 1783-1867 (Folio Society, 1999)
- Victorian Cities (Odhams Press, 1963); reprinted in A Victorian Trilogy (Folio Society, 1996)
- Marx in London: An Illustrated Guide (BBC Books, 1982); reprinted with John Callow (Lawrence & Wishart, 2007)
- A Social History of England (Weidenfeld & Nicolson, 1983); reprinted and updated (Weidenfeld, 1994)
- Toynbee Hall: The First Hundred Years (Routledge, 1984) ISBN 0-7102-0283-0
- Marks & Spencer 1884–1984: A Centenary History (Octopus Books, 1984)
- The Franchise Affair: Creating Fortunes and Failures in Independent Television (Century, 1986); with Joanna Spicer)
- Victorian Things (Batsford, 1988); reprinted in A Victorian Trilogy (Folio Society, 1996)
- A Victorian Portrait: Victorian Life and Values As Seen Through the Work of Studio Photographers (Cassell, 1989); with Archie Miles
- The Channel Islands: Occupation and Liberation 1940–1945 (Batsford/Imperial War Museum, 1995) ISBN 0-7134-7822-5
- Fins de Siècle: How Centuries End, 1400–2000 (Yale University Press, 1996); with Daniel Snowman ISBN 978-0-30006-687-6
- A Social History of the Media: From Gutenberg to the Internet (Polity Press, 2002); with Peter Burke, 4th revised edition, 2020
- Secret Days: Codebreaking in Bletchley Park: A Memoir of Hut Six and the Enigma Machine (Frontline, 2011) ISBN 978-1-84832-615-6
- Special Relationships: People and Places (Frontline, 2012) ISBN 978-1-848-32667-5
- Loose Ends and Extras (Frontline, 2014) ISBN 978-1-848-32773-3

Academic offices
Preceded by Harold Clay	President of the Workers' Educational Association; 1958 – 1967	Succeeded by Ellen McCullough
Preceded by The Lord Gardiner	Chancellor of the Open University; 1978–1994	Succeeded by The Baroness Boothroyd
Preceded by Oliver Franks, Baron Franks	Provost of Worcester College, Oxford; 1976–1991	Succeeded by Richard Smethurst
