= Journal of Psychosomatic Research =

- Discipline: Psychiatry
- Language: English
- Edited by: J.G. Fiedorowicz

Publication details
- History: 1956-present
- Publisher: Elsevier
- Frequency: Monthly
- Impact factor: 4.62 (2021)

Standard abbreviations
- ISO 4: J. Psychosom. Res.

Indexing
- CODEN: JPCRAT
- ISSN: 0022-3999 (print); 1879-1360 (web)
- LCCN: 57003141
- OCLC no.: 01782774

Links
- Journal homepage; Online access

The Journal of Psychosomatic Research is the official medical journal of the European Association of Psychosomatic Medicine and is affiliated with the International College of Psychosomatic Medicine.
