= Implicit self-esteem =

Characteristic of human disposition

Implicit self-esteem refers to a person's disposition to evaluate themselves in a spontaneous, automatic, or unconscious manner. It contrasts with explicit self-esteem, which entails more conscious and reflective self-evaluation. Both explicit and implicit self-esteem are constituents of self-esteem.

== Overview ==
Implicit self-esteem has been specifically defined as "the introspectively unidentified (or inaccurately identified) effect of the self-attitude on evaluation of self-associated and self-dissociated objects". Because by definition implicit self-esteem may not be accessible to conscious introspection, measures of implicit self-esteem do not rely on direct self-reports, but rather infer the valence of associations with the self through other means.

The vast majority of implicit self-esteem measures suggest that an individual's self-evaluation spills over to self-related objects. Also, these measures reveal that people, on average, have positive self-evaluations. The overestimation of one's traits and abilities is argued to be a spillover of positive affect from the self to objects associated with the self. This "spillover" is automatic and unconscious. Implicit self-esteem therefore offers an explanation of positivity bias for things related to the self. Associations are especially important; implicit self-esteem is made up of a series of associations between the self and a positive or negative evaluation of the self. This is especially shown in measures of the Implicit Association Test.

== Influencing factors ==
Several researchers have suggested that levels of implicit self-esteem can be affected by evaluative conditioning, through pairing of construct of the self with positive or negative stimuli, with the objective of altering attitude towards the self. In addition, social comparison, or more specifically the performance of people in one's close social circle, can also affect implicit self-esteem. This information suggests that expectancies of social inclusion is a factor in self-evaluation.

=== Evaluative conditioning ===
The influence of evaluative conditioning on implicit self-esteem is analogous to the principles of classical conditioning on behavioral responses. Although the latter involves pairing an unconditioned stimulus with a neutral stimulus repeatedly until presence of the neutral stimulus evokes the consequence of the unconditioned stimulus, evaluative conditioning involves pairing positive and negative stimulus with an internal construct- the self- to manipulate levels of implicit self-esteem.

The effectiveness of evaluative conditioning hinges on the understanding that implicit self-esteem is interpersonally associative in nature, and that there is a causal relationship between the self and positive/negative social feedback. Studies have shown that participants repeatedly exposed to pairings of self-relevant information with smiling faces showed enhanced implicit self-esteem.

In addition, studies have also found that pairing the word 'I' with positive traits heightens implicit self-esteem regardless of the level of temporal self-esteem prior to the conditioning process. Subliminal presentation of the stimuli reflected that implicit self-esteem is altered in the absence of consciousness. Given that evaluative conditioning changes attitude at a fundamental level and the evaluation that is automatically activated on encountering the attitude object, implicit self-esteem could be assessed as attitude towards the self.

=== Social comparison ===
The self-evaluation maintenance theory (SEM) suggests that the success of one's partner or "significant other" in areas that are self-relevant can cause people to feel threatened, allowing comparison of one's self to the self of another, impacting self-evaluation. Intimacy of relationships predicts likelihood of upward social comparison, which inevitably leads to lower implicit self-esteem.

Given that the SEM is moderated by intimacy of relationship, its impact can be a prominent influential factor between romantic partners. Evidence shows that men tend to have lowered implicit self-esteem when their romantic partner succeeded than when they failed, automatically interpreting their romantic partner's success as their own failure. The underlying explanation might be that self-evaluation is driven by one's expectations around fulfillment of one's role as a man. Another explanation in line with the interpersonal nature of self-evaluation stems from the belief that women are attracted to men's success. Hence, the perception of failure in a man could trigger his fear associated with acceptance from his significant other, as well as abandonment issues. In general, studies of social comparison on implicit self-esteem has yielded the conclusion that comparisons with other individuals can impact one's self-esteem. In addition, these effects are greater when there is a close psychological identification with the partner with whom one is being compared.

== Consequences and correlations ==
An individual's level of implicit self-esteem affects him or her in various crucial domains that are relevant to social, emotional, and cognitive well-being. In some cases, discrepancies between the implicit and explicit self-esteem effects affective well-being and are highly associated with clinical symptoms. Implicit self-esteem also determines how individuals approach relational conflicts and social settings. While low levels of implicit self-esteem can be erroneous, boosts in implicit self-esteem through mechanisms involved in narcissism can also impair an individual's performance in cognitive tasks and external representation of competence in occupational settings.

=== Discrepancies between implicit and explicit self-esteem ===
When explicit self-esteem is lower, it is called damaged self-esteem. When the implicit self-esteem is lower it is called defensive self-esteem.

It has been found that individuals who tend to have a higher correspondence between implicit and explicit self-esteem, trust their intuition.

==== Damaged self-esteem ====
Individuals with a combination of high implicit and low explicit self-esteem possess what psychologists call a damaged self-esteem.

Study results indicate that, in comparison to individuals with low implicit and low explicit self-esteem, individuals with damaged self-esteem exhibit more optimism and less self-protection as well as higher levels of both maladaptive and adaptive perfectionism.

Damaged self-esteem has also been found to correlate with many clinical symptoms and disorders. In particular, the size of the discrepancy between implicit and explicit self-esteem in the direction of a damaged self-esteem has been found to correlate positively with heightened symptoms of depressive symptoms, suicidal ideation and loneliness. While implicit self-esteem itself is not correlated with these internalizing symptoms, the interaction between implicit and explicit self-esteem does. In particular, when individuals display low explicit self-esteem, their level of implicit self-esteem becomes directly and positively correlated with their level of suicidal ideation. This reflects the crucial role of implicit self-esteem in internalizing problems. We can understand the impact of a damaged self-esteem as an entrapment between goals, which stem from implicit self-esteem, and reality, which mediates explicit self-esteem. Indeed, damaged self-esteem has been found to correlate with a maladaptive pattern of perfectionism, which is hinged upon rigidly high expectations that often contribute to failure.

The development of damaged self-esteem also showed a relationship to the use of self-defeating humor as a coping strategy, however, the causal direction is unclear. It could be that the frequent use of self-defeating humor lead to the development of damaged self-esteem (e.g., through a downward spiral of social rejection), or, that people with damaged self-esteem are more likely to use self-defeating humor (i.e., in line with their uncomplimentary view of the self). Another alternative is that both self-defeating humor and damaged self-esteem are caused by a third variable, such as neuroticism or alexithymia.

Damaged self-esteem has also been found to correlate positively with internet addiction, the underlying mechanism of which parallels that of clinical conditions such as bulimia nervosa. This occurrence of compulsions may be attributed to an automatic defense mechanism in which the individual avoids anxiety. However, the development of a damaged self-esteem as an avoidance mechanism can also precipitate difficulties in establishing a consistent self-view.

==== Defensive self-esteem ====
Conversely, individuals with a combination of low implicit and high explicit self-esteem have what is called defensive self-esteem (or synonymously fragile self-esteem). In a comparative study it was found that individuals with defensive self-esteem tended to be less forgiving than others.

=== Implicit self-esteem correlates ===
==== Social performance ====
An important indicator of relationship stability and health is conflict behavior, the way individuals behave during a conflict. Peterson and DeHart found that implicit self-esteem can regulate connection during times of relationship crises. Studies suggest that individuals with high implicit self-esteem tend to engage more in nonverbal positive behaviors during conflict when they perceive their partners to be committed. Positive nonverbal behaviors during conflict is extremely predictive of relationship outcomes such as commitment, satisfaction and stability. Also, implicit self-esteem also predicts sensitivity towards partners' availability or support, even within a relationship-threat. That is, individuals high in implicit self-esteem tend to be implicitly motivated to consciously correct for connection and sensitivity to their partners' effort, despite explicitly doubting their investment in the relationship. This ability to overcome relationship-threats as perpetuated by high levels of implicit self-esteem is crucial to relational well-being.

In addition, low implicit self-esteem has also been found to precipitate uncertainty in self-concept. This instability in grasping the self is especially erroneous in regulation of behaviors in social situations. It has been shown that uncertainty about the self makes people vulnerable to holding and expressing minority opinions, especially those who are susceptible to self-threat (low self-esteem). Individuals with low implicit self-esteem tend to respond defensively to self-threats, and because minority opinions are more self-diagnostic than majority ones, individuals may hold these opinions to shield themselves from threat of uncertainty. They also tend to take extreme views and to over-estimate the social consensus for their views.

==== Gender role ====
Recent studies show that gender differences in self-esteem may be more biologically based, and more prevalent in western cultures.

In women, the neural processes in the left ventromedial prefrontal cortex and hippocampus, areas that are involved in forming self-schemas, were activated more than men. This suggests that the negative affect following ruminating could explain the behavioral differences in gender and implicit self-esteem. Current research states that the reason gender differences in self-esteem may be more prevalent in western cultures is because of the emphasis on the physical appearance of women.

Other research indicates that gender differences play a vital role in implicit self-esteem in how it is influenced by the performance of the significant other.

Implicit self-esteem contains instinctive and empirical factors; which explains that people who are in touch with their feelings would report to have higher explicit self-esteem scores. Women are more prone to trust their feelings and intuition, in contrast to men. The correlation, then, between explicit and implicit self-esteem is greater for women than for men, which are consistent to implicit self-esteem scores.

==== Cognitive performance ====
Self-affirming activities that significantly raises implicit self-esteem, such as viewing one's own Facebook profile page, has been shown to decrease motivation to do well in cognitive tasks of moderate difficulty. Results like this suggest that a peak in unconscious positivity associated with the self may discount an individual's efforts to further prove his worth in other areas. Consequently, this leaves an individual unmotivated to perform well in more practical settings.

== Measurement and assessment ==
Implicit self-esteem is assessed using indirect measures of cognitive processing. These include the Name Letter Task and the Implicit Association Test. Such indirect measures are designed to reduce awareness of, or control of, the process of assessment. When used to assess implicit self-esteem, they feature stimuli designed to represent the self, such as personal pronouns (e.g., "I") or letters in one's name.

=== Name-letter effect ===
The so-called Name Letter Task (NLT, also called Initial Preference Task, IPT) relies on the name-letter effect and is one of the widest used measures of implicit self-esteem. Different measures have been proposed in order to improve the psychometrical properties of the name letter task.

The name-letter effect represents the idea that an individual prefers the letters belonging to their own name and will select these above other letters in choice tasks or rate them as more favourable or attractive than other letters in rating tasks. It seemingly occurs subconsciously, with the mere-exposure effect ruled out as a possible explanation.

This effect has been found in a vast range of studies. In one such scenario, participants were given a list of letters, one of which contained letters from their own name and the other of which contained other letters, and asked them to circle the preferred letter. This study found that, even when accounting for all other variables, letters belonging to the participants' own names were preferred.

Similar results have been found in cross-cultural studies, using different alphabets.

There is a difference between the name-letter effect and 'implicit egotism', the latter being attributed to the way people gravitate towards places, people and situations that reflect themselves, including perhaps similarities with their own name. Indeed, research into the topic has shown similarities between people's names and their future careers; for example, the names Dennis and Denise are overrepresented among dentists.

=== Implicit-association test ===
The implicit-association test is an experimental method used by psychologists to attempt to tap into a person's automatic, or subconscious association between a concept and an attribute. It has been widely used in an attempt to uncover a person's subconscious prejudices against certain members of society, such as those who are overweight, as well as other implicit stereotypes and associations. The test was formatted in order to measure self-esteem. Participants are asked to make rapid responses, co-classifying themselves ("the self") and positive attributes, as well as negative attributes. The speed, or ease of these associations made is said to show a subconscious, or implicit preference for one attribute over another, with regards to the self.

==== Findings ====
Many studies have shown that the vast majority of people's implicit self-esteem is positively biased. That is, people find it a great deal easier to associate themselves with a positive concept than a negative one. Whether this is truly displaying implicit self-esteem is arguable; the findings may instead be linked with illusory superiority, in that people tend to rate themselves as above average on a number of scales.

Implicit self-esteem
In the article "Stalking the perfect measure of implicit self-esteem: The blind men and the elephant revisited?", the validity and reliability of seven implicit self-esteem measures have been explored. The implicit measures were not correlated with one another. However they did correlate, but only faintly with measures of explicit self-esteem. The implicit self-esteem measurements confirmed partial reliabilities in correlation to good test-retest reliabilities. Nonetheless implicit measures were limited in their ability to calculate standard variables, for the test. Certain evidence explained that measurements of implicit self-esteem are delicate to put in context, which is further argued in later research of implicit self-esteem.

==== Links with explicit self-esteem ====
However, the validity of the implicit-association test and implicit self-esteem as a measure of self-esteem itself is questionable due to mixed evidence with regards to explicit self-esteem. On the one hand, researchers in a detailed and comprehensive study of implicit self-esteem found the IAT to correlate weakly, yet consistently, with measures of explicit self-esteem. However, more recent research has found measures of explicit self-esteem, such as questionnaires, to be independent of implicit self-esteem, providing an interesting insight into the validity of implicit self-esteem, explicit self-esteem, and the nature of self-esteem itself.
