= Russell H. Fazio =

Social psychology professor

- Born: October 9, 1952 (age 74); Utica, New York
- Education: Princeton University (M.A., 1976; Ph.D., 1978); Cornell University
- Known for: Affective priming, automatic attitudes, bona fide pipeline, social cognition
- Scientific career
- Fields: Social psychology
- Workplaces: Ohio State University; Indiana University

Russell Fazio is Harold E. Burtt Professor of Social Psychology at Ohio State University, where he heads Russ's Attitude and Social Cognition Lab (RASCL). Fazio's work focuses on social psychological phenomena like attitude formation and change, the relationship between attitudes and behavior, and the automatic and controlled cognitive processes that guide social behavior.

== Education and academic career ==
Russell Fazio received his Bachelor of Arts from Cornell University in 1974, where he graduated summa cum laude and was a member of Phi Beta Kappa. He then attended graduate school at Princeton University, receiving his Master of Arts in 1976 followed by his Doctor of Philosophy in social psychology in 1978.

In 1978, Fazio became an assistant professor of psychology at Indiana University and in 1981, he became an associate professor at the same institution. In 1985, he became a professor of psychology and cognitive science, still at Indiana University. He was a visiting professor at the University of Exeter in 1997. In 2001, he moved to Ohio State University, becoming a distinguished professor of social and behavioral sciences in the Department of Psychology. Since 2002, Fazio has been at Ohio State University as the Harold E. Burtt Chair in Psychology. He also runs a lab called RASCL (Russ’ Attitude and Social Cognition Lab) at Ohio State.

== Research ==
=== Attitude formation ===
Fazio proposed that people developed attitudes toward novel objects through exploration. An exploratory behavior refers to a novel response when a learner tries to discover which actions produce which outcomes in order to achieve rewards or avoid punishment. Fazio et al., designed a novel bean game, in which some beans had associated positive values and some had negative values. Participants must decide whether to eat the bean or avoid it. They found out that subjects had learned the valence of outcomes to be expected for various types of beans during exploration and formed attitudes would generalize to other novel stimuli. Subjects showed better learning for negative beans than for positive beans and then these negative attitudes had a greater effect on generalization. Fazio referred it as "valence asymmetries”.

Fazio also conducted research on implicit attitude formation via classical conditioning. In the evaluation task after subjects were exposed to multiple valenced unconditioned stimulus (US) and novel neutral conditioned stimulus (CS) pairs, subjects rated more positively for the CS paired with positive items than for the CS paired with negative items. Subjects were unaware of pairings. Implicit Association Test (IAT) was used to support this result as well. In the IAT, four categories were pleasant and unpleasant items, positive conditioned stimuli and negative conditioned stimuli. Subjects easily associated pleasant items with positive conditioned stimuli and easily associated negative items with negative conditioned stimuli and they found that responding to incompatible pairs was harder. Evidence altogether suggested that attitudes can be conditioned without awareness.

=== Affective priming and automatic attitudes ===
There has been a long dispute between Fazio and John Bargh about under what conditions automatic attitudes are activated. In Bargh's opinion (1992), automatic attitudes activation is a general and pervasive phenomenon. Most evaluations stored in memories are activated automatically on the mere presence of the social or nonsocial object. However, Fazio thinks that automatic attitudes activation varies as a function of the strength of object-evaluation association. Fazio did experiments using sequential priming procedure to support his position.

David E. Meyer and Roger W. Schvaneveldt laid the groundwork for Fazio's work on affective priming in 1971 with the development of the lexical decision task. The findings of their experiments indicated that lexical decisions for concepts associated with a prime were facilitated by exposure to the prime (i.e., the presentation of the word “doctor” as a prime facilitated identifying the word “nurse”). These findings and others suggested that concepts associated with a prime are automatically activated from memory up on presentation of the prime, and so the prime acts to facilitate responding to semantically related target words.

In a 1986 paper, Fazio, Sanbonmatsu, Powell, and Kardes expanded the research on automatic activation to attitudes, reasoning that a similar priming effect should be found. To test the idea, attitude objects were used as primes, with evaluative adjectives used as target words. Participants were primed with attitude objects and were instructed to indicate whether the target word they saw meant “good” or “bad” as quickly as possible. The focus of these experiments was on the latency of the judgment and to what extent the judgment was facilitated by the presentation of an attitude object as a prime.

In three experiments, Fazio and his colleagues found evidence for automatic attitude activation, as well as evidence for facilitation. Participant responding was faster on trials where the primed attitude objects matched the connotation of the target words: for example, if participants were primed with the attitude object “cockroach”, they were quicker to identify a negative target word (i.e., “disgusting”) as negative, but were slower to identify a positive target word (e.g., “appealing”) as positive. Participants were faster to identify positive word when attitude objects were positive, and faster to identify negative words when the attitude objects were negative.

=== Bona-fide pipeline ===
The bona fide pipeline is a method used to obtain affect and attitude towards various objects or ideas. Fazio's 1995 work on the bona fide pipeline expanded on the bogus pipeline. The bogus pipeline is a method where a subject is told that the researchers will be recording their physiological responses and through those responses, will be able to tell if the subject is lying. The subject is able to be convinced of this because the researchers are manipulating the device from another room, based upon information the subject has given them at an earlier time. This method is similar to a lie detector test. Both the bogus and the bona fide pipelines attempt to measure attitudes without having to deal with the influences of social desirability. Social desirability is when a respondent answers questions so that they will be seen favorably by others.

The bona fide pipeline started as a way to measure how attitudes are activated from memory, then Fazio began testing ways to use the bona fide pipeline to measure racial attitudes. The procedure involves priming, then assessment of a target stimulus, often by pressing one of two buttons on a keyboard. The prime is a word or a picture presented directly before the target. If the subject has the same attitude towards the prime and target, they will be able to categorize the target more quickly. This is called facilitation. If the subject has conflicting attitudes towards the prime and the target, their response time will be slower. An example of facilitation is when a subject who is negatively biased towards African-Americans is able to more quickly categorize negative words as “bad” after being shown a picture of an African-American face.

Fazio used the Modern Racism Scale as an explicit measure of racial biases in his experiments. The validity of Modern Racism Scale as measure of racial attitudes was called into question by the Bona Fide Pipeline results. Subjects who showed less bias on the Modern Racism Scale exhibited more negativity towards Blacks in Fazio's measures. Fazio tested the reactivity of Modern Racism Scale by conducting an experiment where race of the experimenter and whether or not the subject thought the experimenter would see their scores were manipulated. Subjects showed less negative bias towards Blacks on the Modern Racism Scale when they knew their scores would be seen, and their scores dropped even more when the experimenter was Black. The Bona Fide Pipeline results may not have correlated with the Modern Racism Scale, but they were found to correlate with the Black experimenter's ratings of subject friendliness and interest.

The implications of Fazio's results in his Bona Fide Pipeline experiments are that racial biases are often unconscious or implicit. Fazio concluded that these biases are automatically activated from memory, which means they will relate more to personal experiences than a stereotype. He also proposed that reactivity is to blame for the lack of correlation between the Modern Racism Scale and his own unobtrusive measures. Fazio suggested that the Modern Racism Scale measures one's willingness to express prejudice, rather than one's actual biases.

=== The relationships between attitude and behaviors ===
In early 1980s, Fazio et al., examined the relationship between attitude accessibility and the manner of attitude formation. The experiment results suggested that “subjects could respond more quickly in a response-time task to inquires about their attitudes when the attitudes were based upon direct behavioral experience with the attitude objects”(Fazio et al., 1981). The results supported that behavioral experience could facilitate for attitude formation and increase attitude accessibilities.

In 1986, Fazio and his colleagues proposed a model of the attitude-to-behavior process. In this model, behaviors stem from individuals’ perceptions of an attitude object and a situation in which the attitude object is encountered. The degree to which people's attitudes guide their subsequent perceptions of and behavior towards the attitude object is moderated by attitude accessibility. Fazio and Williams conducted an investigation on the 1984 presidential election. The accessibility of attitudes towards two candidates, Reagan and Mondale, was indicated by the latency of responses towards attitudinal inquiries. Subjects, who responded faster, showed greater selective perception and greater attitude and voting-behavior consistency.

== Awards ==
- 2010 – Donald T. Campbell Award for distinguished scientific contributions to social psychology, Society for Personality and Social Psychology
- 2008 – Distinguished Scholar Award, Ohio State University
- 2006 – Thomas M. Ostrom Award for outstanding lifetime contributions to social cognition theory and research, Person Memory Interest Group
- 2004 – OSU Department of Psychology Fred Brown Research Award
- 1999–2003 – NIMH Senior Scientist Award
- 1992–1997 – NIMH Research Scientist Development Award
- 1987 – NIMH MERIT (Method to Extend Research in Time) Award
- 1987–1992 – NIMH Research Scientist Development Award
- 1983 – APA Distinguished Scientific Award for an Early Career Contribution

== Service activities ==
Fazio has been a member of these organizations:

- APA Division 8 Publications Committee (Member, 1985–1987, chair, 1988)
- NIMH Mental Health Behavioral Sciences Research Review Committee, 1988–92
- Committee on Science Initiatives, Society for Personality and Social Psychology, 1990–92
- NIMH Workshop on Integrating Social Psychological Theory in AIDS Research, 1994
- National Science Foundation Workshop on Global Change, 1994
- Fellows Committee, Society for Personality and Social Psychology, 1996–98
- NIH Behavioral and Social Sciences Review Integration Panel, 1998
- APA Early Career Award Selection Panel, 2000
- Executive Committee, Society of Experimental Social Psychology, 2002–05
- Membership Committee (chair), Society of Experimental Social Psychology, 2003–05
- Ostrom Award Selection Committee, Person Memory Interest Group, 2007–08
- Campbell Award Selection Committee, Society for Personality and Social Psychology, 2011
- President-Elect, Midwestern Psychological Association, 2011–12
- President, Midwestern Psychological Association, 2012–13
- Past President, Midwestern Psychological Association, 2013–14
- Diener Award in Social Psychology Panel, Society for Personality and Social Psychology (Member, 2012; chair, 2013)
- Early Career Award Selection Committee, International Social Cognition Network, 2015

== Selected publications ==
=== Books ===
- Petty, R. E., Fazio, R. H., & Brinol, P. (Eds.). (2009). Attitudes: Insights from the new implicit measures. New York: Psychology Press.
- Fazio, R. H. & Petty, R. E. (2007). Attitudes: Their structure, function and consequences (v. 1). Philadelphia, PA: Psychology Press.

=== Selected journal articles ===
- Jones, C. R., Olson, M. A., & Fazio, R. H. (2010). Evaluative conditioning: The “How” question. In M. P. Zanna & J. M. Olson (Eds.), Advances in Experimental Social Psychology (Vol. 43, pp. 205–255). San Diego: Academic Press.
- Han, H. A., Czellar, S., Olson, M. A., & Fazio, R. H. (2010). Malleability of attitudes or malleability of the IAT? Journal of Experimental Social Psychology, 46, 286–298.
- Jones, C. R., Fazio, R. H., & Olson, M. A. (2009). Implicit misattribution as a mechanism underlying evaluative conditioning. Journal of Personality and Social Psychology, 96, 933–948.
- Shook, N. J., & Fazio, R. H. (2009). Political ideology, exploration of novel stimuli, and attitude formation. Journal of Experimental Social Psychology, 45, 995–998.
- Shook, N. J., & Fazio, R. H. (2008). Interracial roommate relationships: An experimental field test of the contact hypothesis. Psychological Science, 19, 717–723.
- Fazio, R. H. & Olson, M. A. (2003). Implicit measures in social cognition: Their meaning and use. Annual Review of Psychology, 54, 297–327.
- Fazio, R. H. (2001). On the automatic activation of associated evaluations: An overview. Cognition & Emotion, 15(2), 115–141.
- Dunton, B. C. & Fazio R. H. (1997). An individual difference measure of motivation to control prejudiced reactions. Personality and Social Psychology Bulletin, 23(3), 316–326.
- Fazio, R. H., Jackson, J. R., Dunton, B. C., & Williams, C. J. (1995). Variability in automatic activation as an unobtrusive measure of racial-attitudes – A bona-fide pipeline. Journal of Personality and Social Psychology, 69(6), 1031–1027.
- Fazio, R. H. (1990). Multiple processes by which attitudes guide behavior – The mode model as an integrative framework. Advances in Experimental Social Psychology, 23, 74–109.
- Fazio, R. H., Sanbonmatsu, D. M., Powell, M. C., & Kardes, F. R. (1986). On the automatic activation of attitudes. Journal of Personality and Social Psychology, 50(2), 229–238.
- Fazio, R. H. & Williams, C. J. (1986). Attitude accessibility as a moderator of the attitude-perception and attitude-behavior relations – An investigation of the 1984 presidential-election. Journal of Personality and Social Psychology, 51(3), 505–514.
- Cooper, J. & Fazio, R. H. (1984). A new look at dissonance theory. Advances in Experimental Social Psychology, 17, 229–226.
- Fazio, R. H., Chen, J. & McDonel, E. C. & Sherman, S. J. (1982). Attitude accessibility, attitude behavior consistency, and the strength of the object evaluation association. Journal of Experimental Social Psychology, 18(4), 339–357.
- Darley, J. M. & Fazio, R. H. (1980). Expectancy confirmation processes arising in the social interaction sequence. American Psychologist, 35(10), 867–881.

== See also ==
- Priming
- Implicit cognition
- Social cognition
