= Arthur S. Reber =

American psychologist (1940–2025)

Arthur S. Reber (March 11, 1940 – September 2, 2025) was an American cognitive psychologist. He was a Fellow of the American Association for the Advancement of Science (AAAS), the Association for Psychological Science (APS) and a Fulbright Fellow. He is known for introducing the concept of implicit learning and for using basic principles of evolutionary biology to show how implicit or unconscious cognitive functions differ in fundamental ways from those carried out consciously.

== Background ==
Reber was born in Philadelphia, Pennsylvania, on March 11, 1940. He received his B.A. in 1961 from the University of Pennsylvania in psychology, working with Justin Aronfreed and Richard Solomon and his M.A. in 1965 and PhD degree in 1967 from Brown University under Richard Millward. He taught at the University of British Columbia from 1966 to 1970 when he moved to Brooklyn College and the Graduate Center of the City University of New York. In 1998 he was appointed Broeklundian Professor of Psychology. He spent 1977–78 as a Fulbright Professor at the University of Innsbruck, Austria and 1995–96 as a visiting scholar at the University of Wales, Bangor. He retired in 2005 but maintained a visiting professor position at the University of British Columbia in Vancouver, Canada and continued to work with colleagues and former students.

Reber died on September 2, 2025, at the age of 85.

== Research ==
=== Implicit learning ===
His M.S. thesis was the first demonstration of implicit learning, a form of learning that takes place without awareness of either the process of acquisition or knowledge of what was actually learned. Those experiments used the artificial grammar learning methods where participants memorize strings of letters that appear random but are actually formed according to complex rules. After the learning period they are able to discern whether new, novel letter-strings are "grammatical" (i.e., conform to the rules) or "non-grammatical" (i.e., violate the rules) without being able to articulate the rules they are using. These processes have much in common with the notion of intuition where people often find themselves able to make effective decisions without being aware of the knowledge they are using, how, or even when, they acquired it. His 1993 book, Implicit Learning and Tacit Knowledge: An Essay on the Cognitive Unconscious reviews the early decades of research on the topic.

A variety of other techniques have been developed to study implicit cognitive functions and a host of related phenomena have been explored including implicit memory, the Implicit Association Test, the role of implicit acquisition in language learning and socialization and the multi-national, multi-university Project Implicit.

Some deny that implicit cognitive functions invariably lie outside of awareness. Researchers such as David Shanks, Pierre Perruchet and Lee Brooks have argued that implicit or tacit knowledge may, in fact, be available to consciousness and that much of this tacit knowledge is not based on rules or patterns but rather on fragments, concrete exemplars and instances. The implications of unconscious cognitive function apply to language acquisition, sport and motor skills, organizational structure, acquiring expertise, belief formation, aging, aesthetics, emotion, and affect as per Reber and Allen's The Cognitive Unconscious: The First Half-Century.

=== Evolutionary theory ===
Reber developed a model based on the assumption that the underlying mechanisms that control implicit learning are based on evolutionarily old cortical and sub-cortical structures, ones that emerged long before those that modulate conscious control and self-reflection. By applying principles of evolutionary biology, the model predicts that implicit cognitive functions should display features that distinguish it from explicit functions. Specifically, implicit processes should show little individual variation compared with explicit; they should be operational early in life and continue to function as people age. They should be robust and remain intact in the face of neurological and psychiatric disorders that compromise explicit processing and should display phylogenetic commonality.

=== Origins of consciousness ===
Reber maintained that human consciousness should be viewed as a pole on a continuum of subjective, phenomenal states that can be traced back to simple reactivity of organic forms and not as something special in our universe. We would do better to treat consciousness like we treat memory, not as a singular thing but as a label for a host of functions all of which have a common functional core. Cognitive psychologists and neuroscientists are, he notes, quite comfortable viewing memory as beginning in very basic functions of cellular biology (as Eric Kandel has shown) while still recognizing the various complex and sophisticated forms we see in humans as on a continuum with the primitive forms.

In his recent book The First Minds: Caterpillars, 'Karyotes, and Consciousness, Reber introduced the Cellular Basis of Consciousness (CBC) model and developed this argument further, arguing that sentience is a fundamental property of all life, that life and consciousness are co-terminous. It is a given in evolutionary biology that all species, extant and extinct, evolved from these unicellular forms. The CBC is based on the presumption that sentience, consciousness followed the same path—the many ways that species experience events, similarly evolved from prokaryotes. Interestingly, the CBC also allows for a novel perspective on the Hard Problem. Rather that search for the ways in which brains make minds, consciousness is viewed as an integral feature of all life. In short, the emergentist's dilemma is reformulated and in a version that is physiologically more tractable. Reviewer Peter Kassan notes that the work is "solidly grounded in actual biology rather than fanciful speculation based on quantum mechanics, information theory, or science fiction." Kassan also says that it remains to be seen "whether the CBC sparks a renaissance of productive research" in consciousness studies. Reber and cell biologist František Baluška examined several biochemical mechanisms that are likely candidates for the emergence of these kinds of sentience.

=== Lexicography ===
In 1985 Reber authored the Dictionary of Psychology, now in its 4th edition. His daughter Emily Reber co-authored the 3rd edition and his wife Rhianon Allen joined for the most recent edition. The dictionary has sold over a half-million copies in six languages. One critic wrote that "[t]his is a very readable book, of value to students and lecturers of all levels."

=== Critique of the paranormal ===
Reber collaborated with research psychologist James Alcock on a topic that interested Reber decades earlier, namely, why the field of parapsychology still exists when, after over 150 years of effort, no paranormal effect has ever been reliably demonstrated. The persistence of this belief is remarkable because, as Reber and Alcock note, parapsychological claims simply cannot be true. For real effects to occur, they argued effects would have to precede the causes of those effects. The laws of thermodynamics have to upended and the inverse square law violated.

=== A separate career ===
In addition to his work in cognitive psychology and the philosophy of mind, Reber has had a parallel career as a reporter and commentator on gambling, particularly poker. As a free-lance writer, he has authored hundreds of columns, most from the psychologist's point of view. These have been published in magazines such as Casino Player, Strictly Slots and Poker Pro Magazine and web sites like PokerListings.com. His breakdown of forms of gambling based on expected value was presented in The New Gambler's Bible. An overview of gaming appeared in Gambling for Dummies (co-authored with Richard Harroch and Lou Krieger) and recently he published Poker, Life and Other Confusing Things, a collection of essays. In 2012 he proposed a novel framework for the notion "gambling" based on the two dimensions of expected value of a game and the flexibility that a game affords each player.

== Books ==
- Reber, A. S. & Scarborough, D. L. (Eds.) (1977). Toward a psychology of reading. Erlbaum.
- Reber, A. S. (1986). Dictionary of psychology. Penguin/Viking. Second edition, 1995, Third Edition, (A. S. Reber & E. S. Reber, 2001), Fourth Edition (A.S. Reber, R. Allen & E. S. Reber, 2009).
- Reber, A. S. (1993). Implicit learning and tacit knowledge: An essay on the cognitive unconscious. Oxford University Press.
- Reber, A. S. (1996). The new gambler's bible: How to beat the casinos, the track, your bookie and your buddies. Three Rivers Press.
- Harroch, R., Krieger, L. & Reber, A. S. (2001). Gambling for dummies. Hungry Minds.
- Reber, A. S. (2012). Poker, life and other confusing things. ConJelCo Press.
- Reber, A. S. (2015). Xero to sixty: A novel. CreateSpace Independent Publishing Platform
- Reber, A. S. (2019). The first minds: caterpillars, 'karyotes, and consciousness. Oxford University Press.
- Reber, A. S. & Allen, R. (Eds.) (2022). The cognitive unconscious: The first half-century. Oxford University Press.
