= Affect priming =

Affective priming, also called affect priming, is a type of response priming and was first proposed by Russell H. Fazio. This type of priming entails the evaluation of people, ideas, objects, goods, etc., not only based on the physical features of those things, but also on affective context. The affective context may come from previous life experiences, and therefore, primes may arouse emotions rather than ideas. Most research and concepts about affective priming derive from the affective priming paradigm, which looks to make judgments of neutral affective targets following positive, neutral, or negative primes. A prominent derivation of affective priming paradigm is the Affect Misattribution Procedure (AMP), developed by Payne, Cheng, Govorun, and Stewart. The main idea of AMP is to measure implicit attitudes, therefore, if the evaluation of the prime stimuli of an object is positive, it is said that the person has a positive attitude toward the object exposed.

== Affective priming paradigm ==
The intent of this affective priming paradigm had initially the intent of eliminating the bias created by affective priming research self-reports. As a consequence, Fazio created the affective priming paradigm, which focuses on the evaluation of automatic stimuli. One finding of studies that use this paradigm says that "performance is typically faster and more accurate when a prime and target are congruent and have the same emotional information (e.g., "flower"–"wedding") compared with when they are incongruent and have different emotional information (e.g., "party' –"corpse")."

== Affective automatic response ==
Affective priming has been long said to be related to implicit attitudes . Some research suggests that affective priming is triggered by multiple, simultaneous mechanisms. Added to this, it has found that deeper processing of the target being evaluated can significantly hinder the influence of the prime. On the other hand, deeper processing prime significantly increases the prime's influence and it is retrieved more easily in subsequent occasions.

There is still a great need of research related to affective priming and automatic processing. Some arguments in favor of a strong relationship between the two argue that these affective priming processes 1) lack intentionality, 2) are highly efficient, 3) have reduced controllability, 4) are triggered at a high speed, especially when there is a motivationally relevant stimulus, and 5) there is reduced awareness of the origin, meaning, and occurrence of the response.

Seib-Pfeifer and Gibbons have suggested that affective priming processing is linked to the right central-to-parieto-occipital positive slow wave (PSW).

Other factors that contribute to this relationship between affective priming and automatic processing include switching tasks, salience asymmetry, and potentially strategic recoding.

== Valence vs arousal ==
There is much discussion in the world of psychology about the effects of valence and arousal in affect priming, since they both seem to affect it, but there has been little research on which of the two has a greater effect on this type of priming. For example, one study by Yao, Shu, and Luo asserts that valence has a greater effect, based on their findings regarding the stability of valence-driven priming effects against arousal-driven effects and their information in the semantic system.
