= Roger W. Schvaneveldt =

American psychologist (born 1941)

Roger W. Schvaneveldt (born April 11, 1941 in Logan, Utah) is an American experimental psychologist with a focus on basic and applied research in cognitive psychology. He earned a PhD from the University of Wisconsin–Madison in 1967 and has been on the faculties of Stony Brook University (1967–77), New Mexico State University (1977–2000), and Arizona State University (2000–10).

In 1971, Schvaneveldt co-wrote with David E. Meyer the seminal article on semantic priming. He developed Pathfinder Network Scaling with Francis T. (Frank) Durso and others, editing a widely cited book on it in 1990, and has also published on expertise, implicit learning, aviation psychology, and on discovery in biomedical informatics with Trevor Cohen and others.

Schvaneveldt is a fellow of the American Association for the Advancement of Science, the American Psychological Association, the Psychonomic Society, and the Association for Psychological Science.

== Selected publications ==
- Meyer, D.E.; Schvaneveldt, R.W. (1971). "Facilitation in recognizing pairs of words: Evidence of a dependence between retrieval operations". Journal of Experimental Psychology. 90 (2): 227–234. doi:10.1037/h0031564. PMID 5134329.
- Schvaneveldt, R.W.; Meyer, D.E. (1973), "Retrieval and comparison processes in semantic memory", in Kornblum, S. (ed.), Attention and performance IV, New York: Academic Press, pp. 395–409
- Meyer, D.E.; Schvaneveldt, R.W.; Ruddy, M.G. (1975), "Loci of contextual effects on visual word recognition", in Rabbitt, P.; Dornic, S. (eds.), Attention and performance V, London: Academic Press, pp. 98–118
- Meyer, D.E.; Schvaneveldt, R.W. (1976). "Meaning, memory structure, and mental processes". Science. 90 (4234): 27–33. Bibcode:1976Sci...192...27M. doi:10.1126/science.1257753. PMID 1257753.
- Schvaneveldt, R.W., ed. (1990), Pathfinder associative networks: Studies in knowledge organization, Norwood, NJ: Ablex, ISBN 978-0893916244
- Schvaneveldt, R.W.; Durso, F.T.; Dearholt, D.W. (1989), "Network structures in proximity data", in Bower, G. (ed.), The psychology of learning and motivation: Advances in research and theory, vol. 24, New York: Academic Press, pp. 249–284
- Schvaneveldt, R.W.; Durso, F.T.; Goldsmith, T.E.; Breen, T.J.; Cooke, N.M.; Tucker, R.G.; DeMaio, J.C. (1985). "Measuring the structure of expertise". International Journal of Man-Machine Studies. 23 (6): 699–728. doi:10.1016/s0020-7373(85)80064-x.
- Gomez, R.L.; Schvaneveldt, R.W. (1994). "What is learned from artificial grammars? Transfer tests of simple association". Journal of Experimental Psychology: Learning, Memory, and Cognition. 20 (2): 396–410. doi:10.1037/0278-7393.20.2.396.
- Schvaneveldt, R.W.; Gomez, R.L. (1998). "Attention and probabilistic sequence learning". Psychological Research. 61 (3): 175–180. doi:10.1007/s004260050023. S2CID 143214301.
- Schvaneveldt, R.W.; Beringer, D.B.; Lamonica, J. (2001). "Priority and organization of information accessed by pilots in various phases of flight". International Journal of Aviation Psychology. 11 (3): 253–280. doi:10.1207/s15327108ijap1103_02. S2CID 109210326.
- Schvaneveldt, R.W.; Cohen, T.A. (2010), "Abductive reasoning and similarity: Some computational tools", in Ifenthaler, D.; Pirnay-Dummer, P.; Seel, N.M. (eds.), Computer-based diagnostics and systematic analysis of knowledge, New York: Springer, ISBN 978-1441956613
- Cohen, T.; Schvaneveldt, R.W.; Widdows, D. (2010). "Reflective random indexing and indirect inference: A scalable method for discovery of implicit connections". Journal of Biomedical Informatics. 43 (2): 240–256. doi:10.1016/j.jbi.2009.09.003. PMID 19761870.
- Schvaneveldt, R.W.; Cohen, T.A.; Whitfield, G.K. (2013), "Paths to discovery", in Staszewski, J. (ed.), Expertise and skill acquisition: The impact of William G. Chase, New York: Psychology Press, ISBN 978-1848728905

== See also ==
- Implicit stereotype, see paper with Meyer from 1971 ("Facilitation")
- Lexical decision task, see papers from 1971 and 1973
- Word superiority effect, see paper from 1982
- Random indexing, see paper with Cohen from 2009 and 2010
- Indirect tests of memory
