= Mental block =

Uncontrollable suppression or repression of painful or unwanted thoughts/memories

A mental block is an uncontrollable suppression or repression of painful or unwanted memories and thoughts. It can also be an inability to continue or complete a train of thought, as in the case of writer's block. In the case of writer's block, many find it helpful to take a break and revisit their topic. Another tactic that is used when people with mental blocks are learning new information is repetition. A similar phenomenon occurs when one cannot solve a problem in mathematics which one would normally consider as simple. Mental blocks can be caused by physical disabilities or simply a lack of focus. Mental blocks are also often used to describe a temporary inability to recall a name or other information. A sudden cessation of speech or a thought process without an immediate observable cause sometimes can be considered a consequence of repression.

== Incidental forgetting ==
Forgetting curves could be associated with mental blocking. The forgetting curve was first described by Ebbinghaus as the natural loss of memory retention over time. Memories can also simply disappear over time from Trace decay which is the weakening of memories over time. This kind of decay stems from both the visual and verbal working memory. Although this triggers decay, some of the information remains stored. Interference is the phenomenon that a memory can be distorted due to the existence of related memories when it comes to retrieval.

Although incidental forgetting is unintentional, it is an important process. A person's brain can become overwhelmed with information, so it is beneficial when unneeded stored information is forgotten. Two interferences are associated with incidental forgetting, proactive and retroactive. Proactive interference is the effect on a person's ability to recall information on a learned subject. An example of this would be a person having trouble remembering a friend's new address when they had the old addresses memorized. Retroactive interference is when new learning affects one's memory on a previously learned task. An example would be an actor learning new lines for an upcoming episode they are filming. When they are learning the new script, this could affect their ability to remember the script that went along with the previous episode. Another interference that some scientists believe is the main culprit of incidental forgetting is one's ability to pay attention which therefore hinders one's brain's ability to properly encode the learned information.

A noteworthy cognitive research study showed study participants a 9-minute video about recognition-induced forgetting. This followed a series of tests that evaluated the participant's comprehension after watching the video. Because the participants watched this video, they were aware of unintentional forgetting and how it occurs. Still, participants fell victim to incidental forgetting when being tested on what they were supposed to remember from the video shown. This led researchers to believe that even when people are aware of the phenomenon of incidental forgetting and challenged not to forget, they still have trouble remembering.

Incidental forgetting differs from incidental forgetting at a rapid pace. Losing memories at a rapid pace is an indicator of amnesia, dementia, mild cognitive impairment, and other conditions that can be caused by age or a traumatic injury.

== Associative blocking ==
Associative blocking is explained as the effects of an interference during retrieval. Associative blocking can be caused by the failure of a cue to reach a specific target because the cue is being replaced by a new cue that grows stronger. This causes the initial cue to deteriorate because each separated memory is competing for first access to the conscious when the shared cue is presented. When interference occurs, two memories that are similar to each other are competing to be remembered. Therefore, the recall of one of those two memories will be more difficult to decipher. To avoid the interference theory from affecting one's recall between multiple memories, researchers say to make it memorable.

== Unlearning ==
Unlearning is associated with two separate stimuli that are attached to a memory trace; the trace is then weakened because it isn't accessed often enough. When one attempted to recover said memory an error happens when a different cue is presented. The studies regarding unlearning are now being associated with interference theory. Interference theory can be defined as the how and the why of long-term memory loss. This theory also suggests that the more information someone learns at one given time, the more quickly they will forget.

The process of unlearning does have positive qualities. Unlearning can be helpful if the information being stored was false or untrue. However, confirmation bias can make it more difficult to unlearn. This is due to the information supporting one's beliefs or views. Decay theory is believed to play a role in the unlearning process as well.

The process of intentionally unlearning has three major parts according to the Harvard Business Review. The first step is to understand mental models are not effective. A mental model can be understood as an assumption on how things work and function. The second step is defined as creating a mental model one is aware of and is accurately aligned with their goals. The last step is changing mental habits. A person needs to change their behaviors and habits. This type of unlearning could be done for many reasons. For example, changing a person's thought process from a negative view to a more positive outlook. The process of unintentionally unlearning is known as "forgetting" since it was not deliberate to unlearn information. Forgetting can happen when information is unused long enough it eventually becomes completely forgotten. A term called fading can also be to blame for forgetting. Fading just means that past learned information can slip away after an extended period of time.

== Motivated forgetting ==
Directed forgetting is another name for Motivated Forgetting, meaning that one is forgetting consciously any recent experience that was unwanted. Motivated forgetting is a psychological behavior that can occur consciously or unconsciously. One may be affected by motivated forgetting due to a traumatic event, to intentionally or unintentionally protect themselves, and other types of defense mechanisms.

Cognitive control is known as the ability to access thoughts and memories, but as well as the ability to have control over unwanted thoughts surfacing from the unconscious. This kind of suppression can be linked to the think/no think (TNT) paradigm, which is a practice that is designed to remind one of the undesired life experiences that result in unwanted feelings, such as a first heartbreak, that one would normally try to avoid thinking about. This forgetting type is surrounded by awareness, so it is categorized under thought suppression.

Also, repression a Freudian theory theorizes that it is a defense mechanism that destroys undesired feelings, ideas, and memories in the unconscious. This defense mechanism is due to the attempt to resolve and eliminate psychological hurt. More specifically, Sigmund Freud, Joseph Breuer, and Pierre Janet's study found that defense mechanisms can be derived from hysteria due to sexual traumas. The decay theory and interference theory can be associated with psychological suppression. The decay theory is memory loss due to time. A painful memory is always going to be stored away, whether one remembers it or not, but the decay theory can help speed along the forgetting process depending on the trauma or association with the memory. Although the interference theory is related to incidental forgetting, it is also a part of the motivated forgetting process. This is because it can create false memories, also known as false memory syndrome. If the memory does not have much detail with it, your brain can create other memories in place of the missing ones. This then creates a false memory.

When unwelcome reminders occur, people often try to exclude unwanted memories from awareness. Stopping retrieval of an unwanted memory is known as ‘retrieval suppression’, a process that engages response override mechanisms formally similar to stopping a reflexive motor action.
