= Serial reaction time =

Parameter in unconscious learning processes

Serial reaction time (SRT) is a commonly used parameter in the measurement of unconscious learning processes. This parameter is operationalised through a SRT task, in which participants are asked to repeatedly respond to a fixed set of stimuli in which each cue signals that a particular response (i.e., button press) needs to be made. Unbeknownst to the participant, there are probabilities governing the occurrence of the cues as they appear in both a repeated sequence and randomised order, thus required responses following one cue have some predictability, influencing reaction-time. As a result, reaction-time to these cues becomes increasingly fast as subjects learn and utilise these transition probabilities.

Combined with artificial grammar learning methods, this paradigm has been used to study a range of learning phenomena including language structure learning, memory, and syntactic priming.

== History of SRT Task ==
The conceptualisation of SRT began with researchers Nissen and Bullemer in 1987, who believed a performance based parameter was necessary in the investigation of attentional requirements of learning and memory. The experimental procedure of early studies that investigated attention, awareness and memory (therefore learning) (including Moray's Attention in Dichotic Listening (1959) and Norman's Memory while Shadowing (1969) amongst others) often involved the presentation of a set of stimuli through some form (e.g, verbal repetition in one ear) while the participant would simultaneously engage in another task that was assumed to require additional attention. This would result in them "unattending" to the presented stimuli (often a set of words), to which experiment results mostly demonstrated that recall of the "unattended" stimuli was poor

After thorough analysis of literature (including Moray (1959) and Norman (1969)), Nissen and Bullemer found that the procedures used in measuring recall of the "unattended" stimuli in such studies were highly reliant on traditional introspective measures, such as recall or recognition tests. Developing research at the time however highlighted that memory for an existing or preceding experience can also be reflected in the subsequent performance of a task, not requiring deliberate manipulation of consciousness. Alongside this, memory for implicit cognitive skills like perceptual and motor learning was investigated through more performance-based parameters. In combination, this led to the direction of their research on investigating whether a performance-based measure like the SRT Task would reflect reduced dependency on the allocation of attention on a stimulus over more traditional introspective measures.

== SRT Task Procedure ==
While there have been various adaptations of the SRT task in correspondence to different areas of Psychological research, at its most basic form the task involves a motor-based interaction with a computer in which participants must respond to a change in a visual stimuli appearing on-screen.

=== Method ===
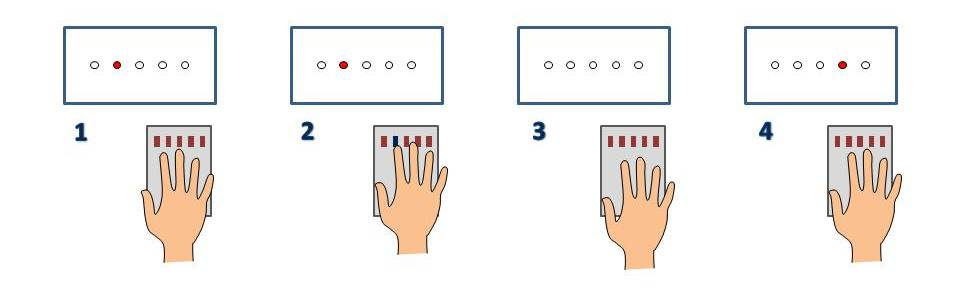
Sequence: 1. Visual cue 2. Corresponding button 3. Fixed delay 4. Next visual cue (This image contains five stimuli positions unlike the original task.)

In a horizontal arrangement, a visual cue may appear in one of four locations on-screen. Each location on the screen is coded to correspond to a button on a response-pad, with buttons typically represented by keys on a keyboard in modern settings. When the visual cue appears on screen, participants must press the corresponding key (e.g, location 1 corresponds to the numerical key "1" on a keyboard) as fast as possible in response to the cue. Each time that this is done defines the end of a trial, therefore the duration of a trial is determined by the participant's reaction-time in pressing the corresponding key. This is the primary measurement of the task. After each trial, there is a short delay of between 200-500 milliseconds before the next cue is shown, thus starting the next trial round.

The pattern in which the cues are shown each trial is predetermined and intentional, with a specific sequential chain being repeated (for instance, 2-3-1-4-3-2-4-1-3-4-2-1) followed by a few random trials in a non-repeating order. The repeating chain of cues is typically repeated as a set of 10.

== SRT Task Applications ==
There are two distinct ways in which the SRT task demonstrates learning processes, primarily in implicit learning and also motor learning. Learning in either case is shown to take place through the gradual reduction of reaction-time across trials.

This decrease in reaction-time suggests increasing familiarity with the repeated components of the stimuli, as there is an increase in learning of the visuomotor association between the cue's position and ability to respond, therefore serving as a measurement for participants' increase in skill learnt. The response modality of the SRT task which records learning through the measurement of visual and sequential efficiency. There are other performance-based implicit learning tasks such as a Contingent Response Task, Hebb Digits Task, Function matching among several others that have greater emphasis on other learning modalities like conceptual fluency, prediction and control.

=== Implicit learning ===
As previously referred to, implicit learning refers to the process of acquiring information in an incidental manner, without the requirement of awareness for learning to take place. This is measured through the SRT task given the gradual reduction in participant response time over the course of the repetition of the set of 10 sequential cues, disguised within the randomly occurring trials in between the sequence. Because the repeated sequence is not made aware to participants, their improvement in performance suggests implicit learning taking place.

One of the findings in Nissen and Bullemer's "Experiment 1" of their original study (1987) using the SRT task supports this. Results found that the average reaction-time of participants for the repeating sequence decreased from 327 milliseconds in the first block of 100 trials to 163 milliseconds in a later block, suggesting that the sequences had somewhat been implicitly learnt or recognised in memory, ultimately leading to the reduced reaction-times.

Learning from this task is more evident when contrasting the reaction-times of participants in periods where they are responding to the disguised repeating sequence versus the non-repeating, random trials. When trials of the repeating sequence are replaced by random ones, adapted studies observed that participants initially began to inappropriately respond to the random sequence, leading to increased reaction-times in comparison to when the repeating sequence of cues were being presented.

=== Motor learning ===
Motor learning is also found to take place through the SRT task as participants acquire the ability to reproduce the repeated sequence by remembering the order in which buttons are pressed. However, motor learning through the task is not facilitated in isolation but instead the skill of reacting could be learned perceptually with participants basing their next prediction on their memory of the visual cue's previous position. Whether the task facilitates pure motor learning or perceptual learning is still being investigated further through modifications of the task, attempting to study the occurrence of one type of learning in isolation of the other.
