= Lexical decision task =

Psycholinguistic procedure

The lexical decision task (LDT) is a procedure used in many psychology and psycholinguistics experiments. The basic procedure involves measuring how quickly people classify stimuli as words or nonwords.

Although versions of the task had been used by researchers for a number of years, the term lexical decision task was coined by David E. Meyer and Roger W. Schvaneveldt, who brought the task to prominence in a series of studies on semantic memory and word recognition in the early 1970s. Since then, the task has been used in thousands of studies, investigating semantic memory and lexical access in general.

== The task ==
Subjects are presented, either visually or auditorily, with a mixture of words and logatomes or pseudowords (nonsense strings that respect the phonotactic rules of a language, like trud in English). Their task is to indicate, usually with a button-press, whether the presented stimulus is a word or not.

The analysis is based on the reaction times (and, secondarily, the error rates) for the various conditions for which the words (or the pseudowords) differ. A very common effect is that of frequency: words that are more frequent are recognized faster. In a cleverly designed experiment, one can draw theoretical inferences from differences like this. For instance, one might conclude that common words have a stronger mental representation than uncommon words.

Lexical decision tasks are often combined with other experimental techniques, such as priming, in which the subject is 'primed' with a certain stimulus before the actual lexical decision task has to be performed. In this way, it has been shown that subjects are faster to respond to words when they are first shown a semantically related prime: participants are faster to confirm "nurse" as a word when it is preceded by "doctor" than when it is preceded by "butter". This is one example of the phenomenon of priming.

== Lateralization in semantic processing ==
Lateralization of brain function is the tendency for some neural functions or cognitive processes to be more dominant in one hemisphere than the other. Studies in semantic processing have found that there is lateralization for semantic processing by investigating hemisphere deficits, which can either be lesions, damage or disease, in the medial temporal lobe. Tests like the LDT that use semantic priming have found that deficits in the left hemisphere preserve summation priming while deficits in the right hemisphere preserve direct or coarse priming.

Examples of summation priming include:

- Shuttle, ground, space -> Launch
- Railroad, coal, conductor -> Train

Examples of direct or coarse priming include:

- Cut -> Scissors
- Write -> Pencil

An fMRI study found that the left hemisphere was dominant in processing the metaphorical or idiomatic interpretation of idioms whereas processing of an idiom’s literal interpretation was associated with increased activity in the right hemisphere.

Other LDT studies have found that the right hemisphere is unable to recognize abstract or ambiguous nouns, verbs, or adverbs. It is, however, able to distinguish the meaning of concrete adjectives and nouns as efficiently as the left hemisphere. The same study also found that the right hemisphere is able to detect the semantic relationship between concrete nouns and their superordinate categories.

Studies in right hemisphere deficits found that subjects had difficulties activating the subordinate meanings of metaphors, suggesting a selective problem with figurative meanings. Bias has also been found in semantic processing with the left hemisphere more involved in semantic convergent priming, defining the dominant meaning of a word, and the right hemisphere more involved in divergent semantic priming, defining alternate meanings of a word. For example, when primed with the word "bank," the left hemisphere would be bias to define it as a place where money is stored, while the right hemisphere might define it as the shore of a river. The right hemisphere may extend this and may also associate the definition of a word with other words that are related. For example, while the left hemisphere will define pig as a farm animal, the right hemisphere will also associate the word pig with farms, other farm animals like cows, and foods like pork.
