= David E. Meyer =

American academic (born 1943)

David Edward Meyer
- Born: February 3, 1943 (age 83); Louisville, Kentucky
- Education: Michigan (Ph.D., M.A.); Wittenberg University (B.A.)
- Known for: Lexical decision task
- Scientific career
- Fields: Mathematical Psychology
- Workplaces: University of Michigan (1977–); Bell Labs
- Thesis: Memorial Processes In Classifying Affirmative Universals (1969)

David Edward Meyer (born in Louisville, Kentucky, February 3, 1943) is an American academic in the field of psychology. He is a professor at the University of Michigan and the chair of the Cognition and Cognitive Neuroscience area of the Psychology Department. He is also the director of the university's Brain, Cognition, and Action laboratory.

He received a B.A. in psychology from Wittenberg University in 1964. He received an M.A. in mathematics in 1966 and a Ph.D. in Mathematical Psychology in 1969 from the University of Michigan. After earning his Ph.D., he worked with Saul Sternberg at Bell Labs before returning to the faculty of the Psychology Department of the University of Michigan in 1977.

With Roger W. Schvaneveldt he developed the lexical decision task to investigate semantic memory. More recently he developed the EPIC cognitive architecture with David Kieras.

He is a Fellow of the Society of Experimental Psychologists, American Psychological Society, American Psychological Association, American Association for the Advancement of Science and the National Academy of Sciences.
