= Ebbinghaus =

Ebbinghaus is a German surname. Notable people with the surname include:

- Bernhard Ebbinghaus (born 1961), German sociologist
- Heinz-Dieter Ebbinghaus (born 1939), German mathematician
- Hermann Ebbinghaus (1850–1909), German psychologist
  - the Ebbinghaus illusion, in experimental psychology
- Julius Ebbinghaus (1885–1981), German philosopher
