= Implicit learning =

Unintentional learning of complex information

Implicit learning is the learning of complex information in an unintentional manner, without awareness of what has been learned. According to Frensch and Rünger (2003) the general definition of implicit learning is still subject to some controversy, although the topic has had some significant developments since the 1960s. Implicit learning may require a certain minimal amount of attention and may depend on attentional and working memory mechanisms. The result of implicit learning is implicit knowledge in the form of abstract (but possibly instantiated) representations rather than verbatim or aggregate representations, and scholars have drawn similarities between implicit learning and implicit memory.

Examples from daily life, like learning how to ride a bicycle or how to swim, are cited as demonstrations of the nature of implicit learning and its mechanism. It has been claimed that implicit learning differs from explicit learning by the absence of consciously accessible knowledge. Evidence supports a clear distinction between implicit and explicit learning; for instance, research on amnesia often shows intact implicit learning but impaired explicit learning. Another difference is that brain areas involved in working memory and attention are often more active during explicit than implicit learning.

== Definition ==
The definition of the concept of implicit learning is still developing and subject to controversy. Despite a considerable number of studies on the topic, there is no agreement on a single definition. Due to such large differences in the understanding of implicit learning, some scientists even argue that the concept does not exist.

Some definitions among dozens:

- Reber argues that implicit learning is "characterized as a situation-neutral induction process whereby complex information about any stimulus environment may be acquired largely independently of the subjects' awareness of either the process of acquisition or the knowledge base ultimately acquired."
- Shanks and St. John claim, "We will reserve the term unconscious learning for learning without awareness, regardless of what sort of knowledge is being acquired."
- Stadler and Frensch say, "Essentially we argue that learning is implicit when the learning process is unaffected by intention."

The definitions of implicit learning typically concentrate on the process of acquisition, the knowledge gained and/or the process used for retrieval.

== History ==
Pioneer work in implicit learning started as early as 1885 with Ebbinghaus's Über das Gedächtnis which touched on learning and memory.

In 1967, George Miller began Project Grammarama at Harvard University. The study was conducted to understand rule-learning. In the experiment participants were given a string with an underlying finite-state grammar to memorize and then were asked to recognize other strings that followed the same grammar. The participants were unaware of the underlying grammar in the memorization stage. The experiment showed that the subjects were better able to memorize strings that followed the rules of the grammar than the strings that did not. Miller coined the term pattern conception to indicate the ability to generalize rules from one observation to another fairly consistent observation. Miller's work was the cornerstone for what is now the most widely studied paradigm of implicit learning: artificial grammar learning.

Miller's work was seminal to Arthur Reber's work in artificial grammar learning. In 1967, Reber devised a replica of Miller's experiment with the adjustment that participants would NOT be told that the string to be memorized followed a set of complex rules and that they would be required to identify whether or not other strings followed the same rules. Reber was interested in studying whether or not systematic recording (an explicit process) was used when the participants made their decisions on whether or not the string followed the rule. The experiment did not show evidence to support this. Reber's initial assumption that artificial grammar learning is therefore implicit is the foundation for much of the more recent grammar learning researches.

Reber's early contributions to implicit learning opened up the topic as a field of study. Since then, research on implicit learning has been slowly on the rise and in the last 20 years, there has been a very significant increase in the number of published articles pertaining to implicit learning. The topic has been studied in relation to real world systems (dynamic control systems), artificial grammar learning and sequence learning most extensively.

There has been much debate on the bare existence of implicit learning because knowledge so gained is not verbalizable. Little research has been conducted on the requirements for the process of implicit learning to take place.

== Paradigms of implicit learning ==
Research in implicit learning must follow certain properties in order to be carried out validly and accurately. The stimuli used to carry out studies should be chosen at random with synthetic and difficult-to-crack rule-governed structures. It is important that the stimuli have an underlying structure that the participant does not have previous knowledge of. In order to prevent participants from understanding the underlying structure, the rule in place must be complex. If the rule is too easy, participants will be able to mentally deconstruct the structure and the experiment will no longer test implicit learning. The stimulus should also have no meaning or attached emotion as to rid of any outside factors that may affect the participant's learning.

The three paradigms of implicit learning that have been studied in depth are artificial grammar learning, sequence learning, and dynamic system control. Other paradigms include probability learning, conditioned response learning, acquisition of invariant characteristics and second language acquisition.

=== Artificial grammar learning ===
Artificial grammar learning was used in some of the earliest studies conducted on implicit learning in the 1960s by Arthur Reber. A variety of artificial grammars have been used since then, all encompassing the Markovian systems. These systems have basic foundations in mathematics which makes them easier to understand by investigators while remaining apparently arbitrary.

In artificial grammar learning research there are generally two phases. In the first stage participants absorb a string of letters, all of which follow the rules of an artificial grammar. In the second stage, the participants are told to separate new strings as either following the rules of the grammar or not. In artificial grammar learning studies, the results usually show that the participant is able to separate the strings more accurately than probability would predict. However, when asked to clarify why they chose to classify particular strings in as grammatical, participants were typically unable to verbalize their reasoning.

=== Sequence learning ===
Sequence learning is usually tested through a visual task where participants react to a series of visual events which may or may not be sequentially structured. In the task, visual stimuli appear in a specific place on a computer screen and participants are told to press a key. The stimuli may follow an underlying pattern or follow a set of transition rules which the participant is unaware of. Studies show that participants reacting to structured stimuli have a faster resulting reaction time than those exposed to random stimuli. The participants are unable to explain the acquisition of their knowledge.

It has been shown that people are able to implicitly learn underlying sequential structure in a series using sequence learning. Language is an example of daily sequential learning. Although individuals are unable to communicate how they have acquired such knowledge of rules, studies show people generally have knowledge of a number of factors that imply sequence learning. When reading, sentences that follow proper syntax and use proper context are read faster than those which are not. People are also able to fairly quickly predict an upcoming word that occurs in a sequence and are able to create sentences which follow sequence while following the rules of English. This implies the use of sequence learning in language. Such implicit learning processes in language structure learning have also been simulated using connectionist models.

=== Dynamic system control ===
Dynamic system control experiments require participants to try to control the level of outcome variables through the control of the level of income variables. Participants have knowledge of outcome variables throughout the experiment and are free to change input variables accordingly. In these experiments, participants are usually able to bring the system to control but are unable to verbalize the rules they followed in order to do so.

For example, in the sugar production task conducted by Berry and Broadbent in 1984 participants were asked to take on the role of the manager of a sugar production factory. As such, participants had to produce a fixed amount of sugar output. In order to do this, participants were expected to manipulate the value for the number of factor workers (input) until the optimal level of sugar output was attained.

Another experiment conducted by Berry and Broadbent is the person interaction task. The person interaction tasks involves a participant and a virtual person. The computer-person is set to communicate using a fixed level of intimacy. The task of the participant is to interact with the computer and make changes to the level of intimacy until the level is set to "very friendly". Participants were required to maintain the "very friendly" level.

=== Probability learning ===
The original probability learning experiment was developed by Lloyd Humphreys in 1939. In Humphreys' experiment, a ready signal was flashed and the participant was then told to predict whether or not a reinforcing event would happen and then the result was recorded. Humphreys claimed this experiment was synonymous to a conditioning experiment as he felt that the experiment allowed for reinforcement could be studied holding the result as reinforcement for the individuals predictions.

Later, William Estes and his colleagues took Humphreys' experiment and made some important changes. Estes saw that a single button was not enough to test learning and so had multiple buttons (usually two) corresponding to multiple outcomes that the participant had to predict. Results came to show that the individuals responses came to match the probability of the outcomes. Probability learning shows the implicit learning of a random structure of a sequence of events.

=== Adapting paradigms to change stereotypes ===
Implicit learning is a strong contributor to the development of stereotypes, and it can be adapted to change stereotypes as well. Implicit learning paradigms may be modified to change a variety of stereotypes one holds against others or oneself and thus can be used to reduce depression associated with prejudice (i.e., "deprejudice").

== Characteristics of implicit systems ==
The following is a list of common characteristics found in the implicit system:

1. Robustness: Unconscious processes should be robust when it comes to disorders due to the fact that unconscious processes evolved earlier on the evolutionary timeline relative to conscious processes.
2. Age independence: Implicit learning is relatively unaffected by age and development as compared with explicit learning.
3. Low variability: Compared to explicit learning, there is little variation in the ability to gain implicit knowledge from person to person.
4. IQ independence: Contrary to explicit learning, IQ scores should have very little relation to implicit learning.
5. Commonality: Implicit learning should show commonality among different species.

Some other characteristics of the implicit system have also been identified in relation to its cognitive representations, mechanisms and processes.

== Measurements of awareness ==
Implicit learning experiments use a dissociation paradigm to show that the knowledge was gained unintentionally and without awareness by the participant. Some measures of awareness include verbal reports, forced-choice tests and subjective tests.

=== Verbal reports ===
In most implicit learning experiments, participants show that they have gained relevant information but are unable to verbalize the knowledge that they have gained. In one of Arthur Reber's studies, participants were asked to write a report which would guide new participants through the classification necessary for the artificial grammar learning experiment. Using the reports, the new participants were able to perform above chance. However, their performance of classification level was not as high as the performance of experimental participants, indicating that the reports did not incorporate all of the original participants' acquired knowledge.

This measurement has been criticized for its lack of sensitivity (inability to portray all acquired knowledge) and because it doesn't use the same knowledge of the performance in order to test implicit learning.

=== Forced-choice tests ===
Forced-choice tests require participants to make a decision on recognition. In the artificial grammar learning paradigm, participants are asked if they recognized pieces of specific strings of letters. In a study conducted by Dulany and colleges, participants were asked to identify letters which would complete the string in a grammatically correct way. The study showed that the letters they chose had a relationship with the participant's performance. The high correlation indicates that participants were aware of at least some of the knowledge they had acquired.

This test among others has been used as an example which critics have used to argue that there is no proof of the existence of implicit knowledge. Others have counter-argued that this test cannot be used to dismiss the concept of implicit learning altogether because it assumes that the participant is consciously sensitive to all of his/her relevant knowledge.

=== Subjective tests ===
In subjective testing, implicit learning occurs when participants who show above chance performance have no knowledge of their judgements. Subjects who are theorized to have no knowledge of their judgements generally are convinced that their judgements are guesses and will have an accuracy rate that has little correlation with their ratings of confidence they assigned to each of their judgements. In artificial grammar learning and sequence learning participants showed higher than chance performance. These participants were convinced that they were only making assumptions and had no real knowledge of the subject. Results usually showed that in reality, they had gained implicit knowledge throughout the experiment.

== Methodological issues ==
The field of implicit learning has been subject to debate due to its methodology. A large portion of the discussion of issues with methodology seem to be in the measurement of implicit learning. Currently, experiments of implicit learning is measured through the retrieval of implicit knowledge because measurements that can accurately test the direct process of implicit learning have not been developed. It is important to differentiate between measurement of conscious and unconscious processes in order to make valid assessments.

In experiments of implicit learning, it is necessary to use a measure that is pure and sensitive. The tool must be able to filter out only what has been learned in the experiment process and to collect and display all of what has been learned throughout the process. These factors are especially important in implicit learning experiments as the resulting in percentages that are only slightly above statistical significance. This is due to the fact that testing is usually in the form of a yes or no answer which would give a 50% probability due to chance statistic. Subjects regularly score 55-70%. Measures that are able to collect all and only what is learned during the experimental process would provide more accuracy in the results.

The measurement must be conducted at the appropriate time otherwise what is assumed to be a measurement of implicit learning may actually be a measurement of explicit learning. Though the study may focus on implicit learning, if measurement is taken too long after the core of the experiment occurs one could argue that learning was explicit but explicit knowledge was momentarily lost. No rules have been laid out guiding selection of an appropriate time for testing.

The speed and duration of the tests is also important in measuring implicit learning. When time duration is short, it is more likely that implicit learning will be tested as opposed to explicit learning. This is because the latter (explicit learning) requires time for the memories to set in and build connections after the learning process. However, the time pressure does not necessarily mean that implicit knowledge will purely be tested.

== Distinguishing implicit learning and explicit learning ==
=== Transfer specificity ===
In implicit learning, transfer of the acquired knowledge is generally weak. Studies show that knowledge gained through implicit learning is only of limited transfer to structurally similar tasks. Whereas some research showed that participants were unable to use implicit learning to complete structurally similar tasks at all, others showed decreased transfer. Implicit knowledge is characterized to be highly inaccessible.

=== Non-intentional learning ===
Implicit learning occurs through passive, incidental and automatic acquisition. No conscious effort to absorb the learning is required. In contrast, explicit learning requires the conscious observation, understanding and memorization of content. Some studies show that passive learning do just as well as individuals who learn explicitly through dissecting structure.

=== Robustness ===
Some psychologists argue that implicit learning is more stable than explicit learning because the unconscious mind developed earlier than the conscious mind on the evolutionary timeline. Furthermore, some studies show the robustness of implicit learning through the evidence that other factors that are unique to each individual (i.e. intelligence quotient) as well as multitasking is less likely to affect implicit learning than explicit learning. Reber says that implicit learning should in all likelihood be more resilient when it comes to injury.

== Amnesia studies ==
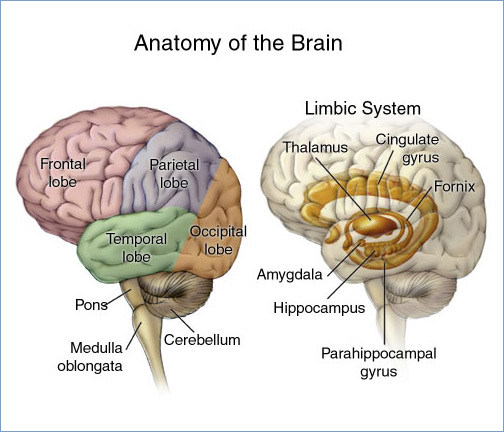
The human brain. Note the location of the hippocampus, hippocampal gyrus, and amygdala.

There have been a good number of recent studies which test implicit processes in subjects with mental disorders and abnormalities. Many of these studies have focused on amnesiac patients because the disorder deals primarily with consciousness and the ability to recognize familiar stimuli by retrieval of things that have been previously learned. The research conducted showed that tasks that relied on conscious processes or direct recognition proved to be difficult for their patients, whereas tasks which only required the functioning of implicit processes were conducted with less impediment.

=== Case study: Henry Gustav Molaison ===
Henry Gustav Molaison, formerly known as patient H.M., was an amnesiac patient following the surgery of his hippocampus, hippocampal gyrus, and amygdala in order to relieve the symptoms of his epilepsy. Due to his surgery, Molaison developed anterograde amnesia which made him forgetful of recently occurring events. His amnesia made it so that he had severe difficulties remembering events that happened as little as a half hour ago in his life. Although Molaison was unable to learn consciously, he still had almost normal abilities when it came to his sensorimotor skills indicating that he may have held on to some remnants of his unconscious (implicit) previous experiences.

== See also ==
- Implicit memory
- Implicit cognition
