= Priming (psychology) =

Alleged impact on behavior

Priming is a concept in psychology and psycholinguistics to describe how exposure to one stimulus may influence a response to a subsequent stimulus, without conscious guidance or intention. The priming effect is the positive or negative effect of a rapidly presented stimulus (priming stimulus) on the processing of a second stimulus (target stimulus) that appears shortly after. Generally speaking, the generation of priming effect depends on the existence of some positive or negative relationship between priming and target stimuli. For example, the word nurse might be recognized more quickly following the word doctor than following the word bread. Priming can be perceptual, associative, repetitive, positive, negative, affective, semantic, or conceptual. Priming effects involve word recognition, semantic processing, attention, unconscious processing, and many other issues, and are related to differences in various writing systems. How quickly this effect occurs is contested; some researchers claim that priming effects are almost instantaneous.

Priming works most effectively when the two stimuli are in the same modality. For example, visual priming works best with visual cues and verbal priming works best with verbal cues. But priming also occurs between modalities, or between semantically related words such as "doctor" and "nurse".

In 2012, a great amount of priming research was thrown into doubt as part of the replication crisis. Many of the landmark studies that found effects of priming were unable to be replicated in new trials using the same mechanisms. The experimenter effect may have allowed the people running the experiments to subtly influence them to reach the desired result, and publication bias tended to mean that shocking and positive results were seen as interesting and more likely to be published than studies that failed to show any effect of priming. The result is that the efficacy of priming may have been greatly overstated in earlier literature, or have been entirely illusory.

== Types ==
=== Positive and negative priming ===
The terms positive and negative priming refer to when priming affects the speed of processing. A positive prime speeds up processing, while a negative prime lowers the speed to slower than un-primed levels. Positive priming is caused by simply experiencing the stimulus, while negative priming is caused by experiencing the stimulus, and then ignoring it. Positive priming effects happen even if the prime is not consciously perceived. The effects of positive and negative priming are visible in event-related potential (ERP) readings.

Positive priming is thought to be caused by spreading activation. This means that the first stimulus activates parts of a particular representation or association in memory just before carrying out an action or task. The representation is already partially activated when the second stimulus is encountered, so less additional activation is needed for one to become consciously aware of it.

Negative priming is more difficult to explain. Many models have been hypothesized, but currently the most widely accepted are the distractor inhibition and episodic retrieval models. In the distractor inhibition model, the activation of ignored stimuli is inhibited by the brain. The episodic retrieval model hypothesizes that ignored items are flagged 'do-not-respond' by the brain. Later, when the brain acts to retrieve this information, the tag causes a conflict. The time taken to resolve this conflict causes negative priming. Although both models are still valid, recent scientific research has led scientists to lean away from the distractor inhibitor model.

=== Perceptual and conceptual priming ===
The difference between perceptual and conceptual types of priming is whether items with a similar form or items with a similar meaning are primed, respectively.

Perceptual priming is based on the form of the stimulus and is enhanced by the match between the early and later stimuli. Perceptual priming is sensitive to the modality and exact format of the stimulus. An example of perceptual priming is the identification of an incomplete word in a word-stem completion test. The presentation of the visual prime does not have to be perfectly consistent with later testing presentations in order to work. Studies have shown that, for example, the absolute size of the stimuli can vary and still provide significant evidence of priming.

Conceptual priming is based on the meaning of a stimulus and is enhanced by semantic tasks. For example, the word table will show conceptual priming effects on the word chair, because the words belong to the same category.

=== Repetition priming ===
Repetition priming, also called direct priming, is a form of positive priming. When a stimulus is experienced, it is also primed. This means that later experiences of the stimulus will be processed more quickly by the brain. This effect has been found on words in the lexical decision task. There are multiple theories and models that reason why repetition priming might exist. For example, facilitation suggests that when a stimulus overlaps with existing or previously seen representation then information will travel faster.

=== Semantic priming ===
This image shows a priming web built from different types of priming. The lines in this web indicate associations that an individual might have. If two words are more closely linked in the web, then they are more likely to be more quickly recognized when primed with a nearby word. The dotted lines indicate morpheme primes, or primes from words that sound similar to each other, while the straight lines indicate semantic primes or words that have meanings or associations that relate to each other.

In semantic priming, the prime and the target are from the same semantic category and share features. For example, the word dog is a semantic prime for wolf, because the two are similar animals. Semantic priming is theorized to work because of spreading activation within associative networks. When a person thinks of one item in a category, similar items are stimulated by the brain. Even if they are not words, morphemes can prime for complete words that include them. An example of this would be that the morpheme 'psych' can prime for the word 'psychology'.

In support with further detail, when an individual processes a word sometimes that word can be affected when the prior word is linked semantically. Previous studies have been conducted, focusing on priming effects having a rapid rise time and a hasty decay time. For example, an experiment by Donald Foss researched the decay time of semantic facilitation in lists and sentences. Three experiments were conducted and it was found that semantic relationships within words differs when words occur in sentences rather than lists. Thus, supporting the ongoing discourse model. However, the underlying cognitive mechanisms of semantic representation has been established over a few decades, the research has suffered from small sample sizes and lack of linguistic and cultural diversity. Nevertheless, recently it has been shown that the semantic priming is a robust and generalizable effect across languages and cultures.

=== Subliminal priming ===
Subliminal priming occurs when the processing of a visible target is facilitated by the prior presentation of an identical or related prime that remains below the threshold of conscious awareness. This effect is frequently induced in experimental settings through visual masking, a technique where a stimulus is rendered invisible by presenting other masking stimuli in close spatial and temporal proximity. Research indicates that subliminal priming can influence behavior and brain activity across visual, semantic, and even motor levels. For instance, subliminally extracting the meaning of words has been demonstrated across various word categories, and masked stimuli can bias motor responses, cue task switching, and modulate motivation.

Despite its robust effects on specialized processors, subliminal priming has three main physiological and cognitive limits. First, the priming effect rapidly decreases as processing depth increases, meaning that nonconscious stimuli have only minimal influence on higher cognitive functions or complex decision-making, such as performing multiple arbitrary mathematical operations. Second, the effects of a subliminal prime are strictly time-limited and typically cease to be detectable after 500 milliseconds. Finally, subliminal priming generally fails to produce flexible, long-lasting modifications in executive control, meaning that strategic adaptations usually require conscious awareness of the stimuli.

=== Associative priming ===
In associative priming, the target is a word that has a high probability of appearing with the prime, and is "associated" with it but not necessarily related in semantic features. The word dog is an associative prime for cat, since the words are closely associated and frequently appear together (in phrases like "raining cats and dogs"). A similar effect is known as context priming. Context priming works by using a context to speed up processing for stimuli that are likely to occur in that context. A useful application of this effect is reading written text. The grammar and vocabulary of the sentence provide contextual clues for words that will occur later in the sentence. These later words are processed more quickly than if they had been read alone, and the effect is greater for more difficult or uncommon words.

=== Response priming ===
In the psychology of visual perception and motor control, the term response priming denotes a special form of visuomotor priming effect. The distinctive feature of response priming is that prime and target are presented in quick succession (typically, less than 100 milliseconds apart) and are coupled to identical or alternative motor responses. When a speeded motor response is performed to classify the target stimulus, a prime immediately preceding the target can thus induce response conflicts when assigned to a different response as the target. These response conflicts have observable effects on motor behavior, leading to priming effects, e.g., in response times and error rates. A special property of response priming is its independence from visual awareness of the prime: For example, response priming effects can increase under conditions where visual awareness of the prime is decreasing.

=== Masked priming ===
The masked priming paradigm has been widely used in the last two decades in order to investigate both orthographic and phonological activations during visual word recognition. The term "masked" refers to the fact that the prime word or pseudoword is masked by symbols such as ###### that can be presented in a forward manner (before the prime) or a backward manner (after the prime). These masks enable to diminish the visibility of the prime. The prime is usually presented less than 80 ms (but typically between 40-60 ms) in this paradigm. In all, the short SOA (Stimuli Onset Asynchrony, i.e. the time delay between the onset of the mask and the prime) associated with the masking make the masked priming paradigm a good tool to investigate automatic and irrespective activations during visual word recognition. Forster has argued that masked priming is a purer form of priming, as any conscious appreciation of the relationship between the prime and the target is effectively eliminated, and thus removes the subject's ability to use the prime strategically to make decisions. Results from numerous experiments show that certain forms of priming occur that are very difficult to occur with visible primes. One such example is form-priming, where the prime is similar to, but not identical to the target (e.g., the words nature and mature). Form priming is known to be affected by several psycholinguistic properties such as prime-target frequency and overlap. If a prime is higher frequency than the target, lexical competition occurs, whereas if the target has a higher frequency than the prime, then the prime pre-activates the target and if the prime and target differ by one letter and one phoneme, the prime competes with the target, leading to lexical competition. Not only is it affected by the prime and target, but also by individual differences such that people with well-established lexical representations are more likely to show lexical competition than people with less-established lexical representation.

=== Kindness priming ===
Kindness priming is a specific form of priming that occurs when a subject experiences an act of kindness and subsequently experiences a lower threshold of activation when subsequently encountering positive stimuli. A unique feature of kindness priming is that it causes a temporarily increased resistance to negative stimuli in addition to the increased activation of positive associative networks. This form of priming is closely related to affect priming.

=== Affective priming ===
Affective or affect priming entails the evaluation of people, ideas, objects, goods, etc., not only based on the physical features of those things, but also on affective context. Most research and concepts about affective priming derive from the affective priming paradigm where people are asked to evaluate or respond to a stimuli following positive, neutral, or negative primes. Some research suggests that valence (positive vs. negative) has a stronger effect than arousal (low vs. high) on lexical-decision tasks. Affective priming might also be more diffuse and stronger when the prime barely enters conscious awareness. Evaluation of emotions can be primed by other emotions as well. Thus, neutral pictures, when presented after unpleasant pictures, are perceived as more pleasant than when presented after pleasant pictures.

=== Cultural priming ===
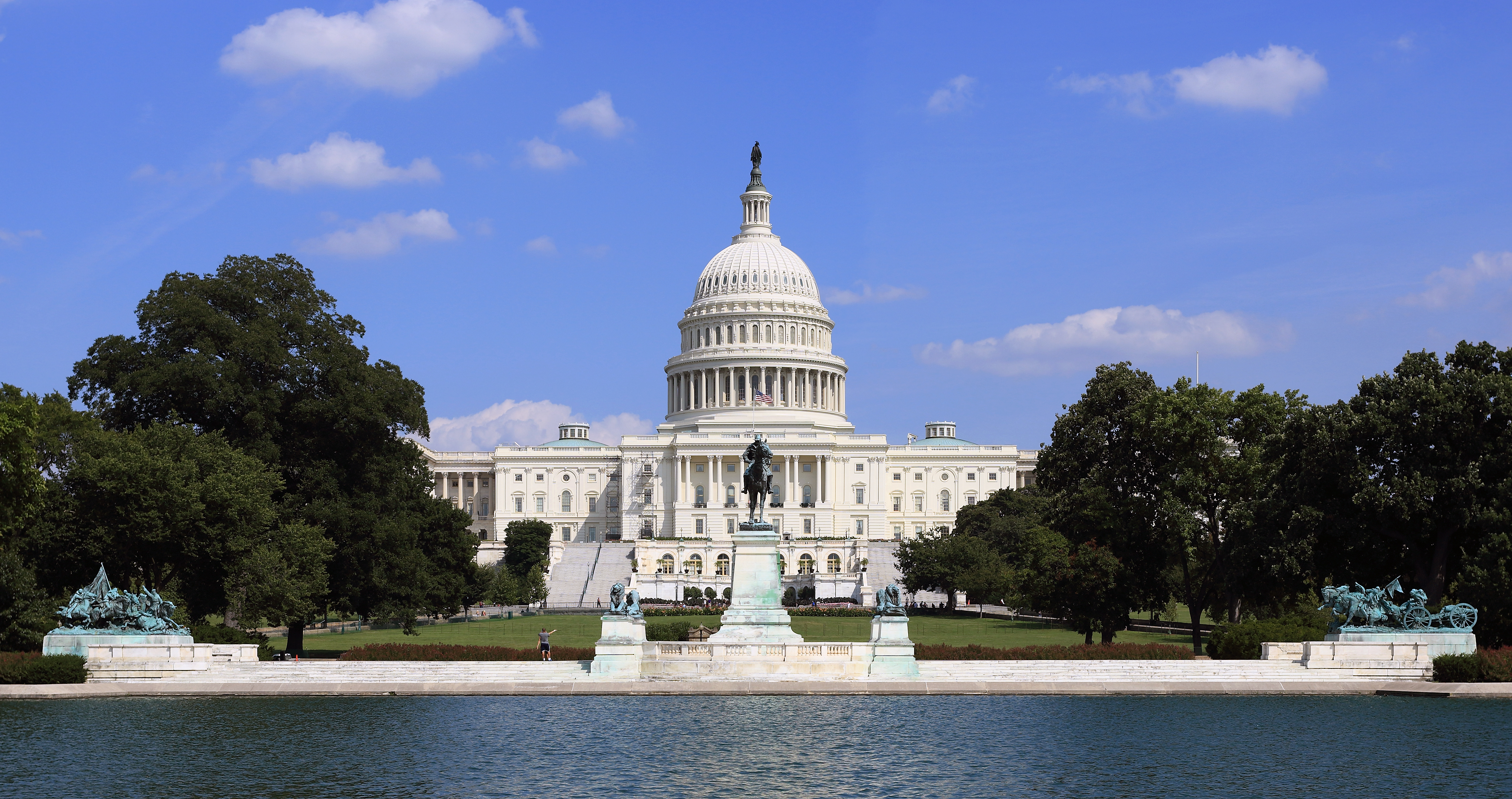
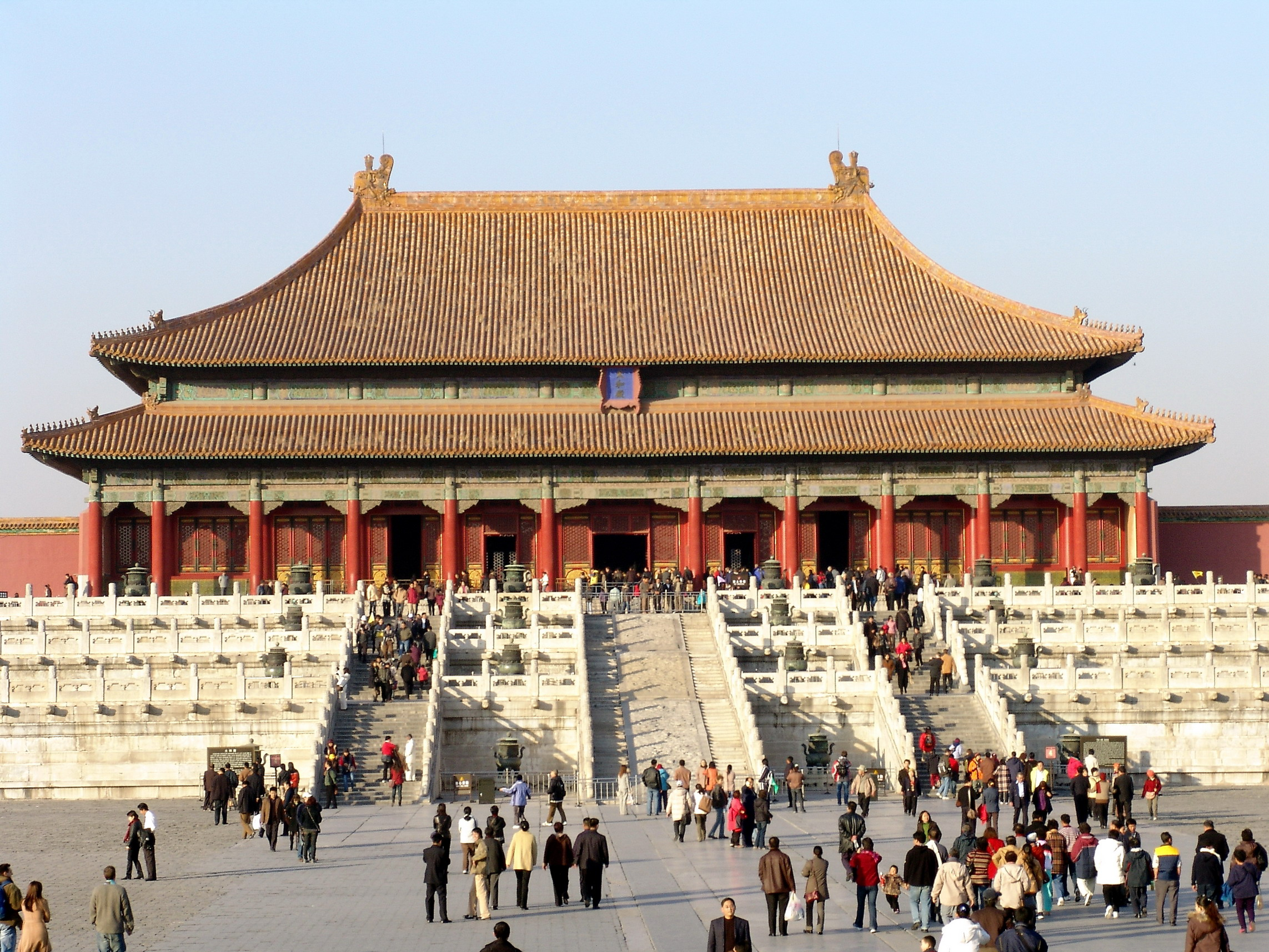
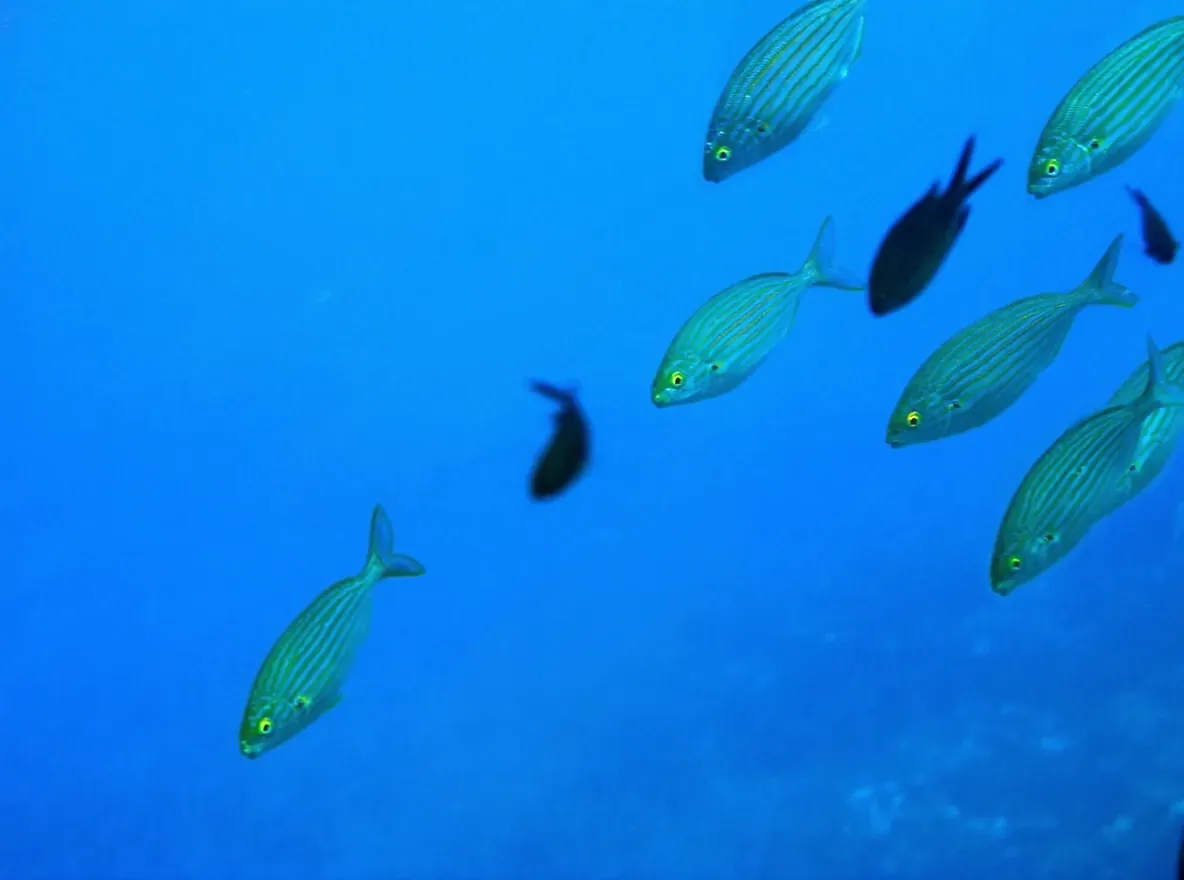
Study participants primed to think of the United States were more likely to describe a picture of a lone fish as being independent from its group; those primed to think of China more likely to describe it as being chased or rejected by the group.

Cultural priming is a technique employed in the field of cross-cultural psychology and social psychology to understand how people interpret events and other concepts, like cultural frame switching and self-concept. For example, Hong and colleagues showed participants a different set of culture related images, like the U.S. Capitol building or Chinese temples. Then participants watched a clip of a fish swimming ahead of a group of fish. After Chinese cultural priming, participants in Hong Kong were more likely to see the fish as acting in response to the group, such as agreeing with the statement, "the one fish is being chased/rejected by the other fish." In contrast, after seeing symbols of U.S. culture, participants were more likely to see the fish as acting based on internal causes, such as agreeing with the statement, "the one fish is independent from the other fish." In short, when people from bi-cultural societies are primed with symbols from different cultures, they are more likely to give explanations (attributions) that are more common in that culture.

=== Anti-priming ===
Anti-priming is a measurable impairment in processing information owing to recent processing of other information when the representations of information overlap and compete. Strengthening one representation after its usage causes priming for that item but also anti-priming for some other, non-repeated items. For example, in one study, identification accuracy of old Chinese characters was significantly higher than baseline measurements (i.e., the priming effect), while identification accuracy of novel characters was significantly lower than baseline measurements (i.e., the anti-priming effect). Anti-priming is said to be the natural antithesis of repetition priming, and it manifests when two objects share component features, thereby having overlapping representations. However, one study failed to find anti-priming effects in a picture-naming task even though repetition priming effects were observed. Researchers argue that anti-priming effects may not be observed in a small time-frame.

== Replicability controversy ==
The replicability and interpretation of priming findings has become controversial. Studies in 2012 failed to replicate findings, including age priming, with additional reports of failure to replicate this and other findings such as social-distance also reported. However, some replications have been successful.

Priming is often considered to play a part in the success of sensory branding of products and connected to ideas like crossmodal correspondencies and sensation transference. Known effects are e.g. consumers perceiving lemonade suddenly as sweeter when the logo of the drink is more saturated towards yellow, although this result has not yet been replicated by an independent study.

Although semantic, associative, and form priming are well established, some longer-term priming effects were not replicated in further studies, casting doubt on their effectiveness or even existence. Nobel laureate and psychologist Daniel Kahneman has called on priming researchers to check the robustness of their findings in an open letter to the community, claiming that priming has become a "poster child for doubts about the integrity of psychological research." In 2022, Kahneman described behavioral priming research as "effectively dead." Other critics have asserted that priming studies suffer from major publication bias, experimenter effect and that criticism of the field is not dealt with constructively.

== Measuring the effects of priming ==
Priming effects can be found with many of the tests of implicit memory. Tests such as the word-stem completion task, and the word fragment completion task measure perceptual priming. In the word-stem completion task, participants are given a list of study words, and then asked to complete word "stems" consisting of 3 letters with the first word that comes to mind. A priming effect is observed when participants complete stems with words on the study list more often than with novel words. The word fragment completion task is similar, but instead of being given the stem of a word, participants are given a word with some letters missing. The lexical decision task can be used to demonstrate conceptual priming. In this task, participants are asked to determine if a given string is a word or a nonword. Priming is demonstrated when participants are quicker to respond to words that have been primed with semantically-related words, e.g., faster to confirm "nurse" as a word when it is preceded by "doctor" than when it is preceded by "butter". Other evidence has been found through brain imaging and studies from brain injured patients. Another example of priming in healthcare research was studying if safety behaviors of nurses could be primed by structuring change of shift report. A pilot simulation study found that there is early evidence to show that safety behaviors can be primed by including safety language into report.

== Effects of brain injuries ==
=== Amnesia ===
Patients with amnesia are described as those who have suffered damage to their medial temporal lobe, resulting in the impairment of explicit recollection of everyday facts and events. Priming studies on amnesic patients have varying results, depending on both the type of priming test done, as well as the phrasing of the instructions.

Amnesic patients do as well on perceptual priming tasks as healthy patients, however they show some difficulties completing conceptual priming tasks, depending on the specific test. For example, they perform normally on category instance production tasks, but show impaired priming on any task that involves answering general knowledge questions.

Phrasing of the instructions associated with the test has had a dramatic impact on an amnesic's ability to complete the task successfully. When performing a word-stem completion test, patients were able to successfully complete the task when asked to complete the stem using the first word that came to mind, but when explicitly asked to recall a word to complete the stem that was on the study list, patients performed at below-average levels.

Overall, studies from amnesic patients indicate that priming is controlled by a brain system separate from the medial temporal system that supports explicit memory.

=== Aphasia ===
Perhaps the first use of semantic priming in neurological patients was with stroke patients with aphasia. In one study, patients with Wernicke's aphasia who were unable to make semantic judgments showed evidence of semantic priming, while patients with Broca's aphasia who were able to make semantic judgments showed less consistent priming than those with Wernicke's aphasia or normal controls. This dissociation was extended to other linguistic categories such phonology and syntactic processing by Blumstein, Milberg and their colleagues.

=== Dementia ===
Patients with Alzheimer's disease (AD), the most common form of dementia, have been studied extensively as far as priming goes. Results are conflicting in some cases, but overall, patients with AD show decreased priming effects on word-stem completion and free association tasks, while retaining normal performance on lexical decision tasks. These results suggest that AD patients are impaired in any sort of priming task that requires semantic processing of the stimuli, while priming tasks that require visuoperceptual interpretation of stimuli are unaffected by Alzheimers.

=== Focal cortical lesions ===
Patient J.P., who suffered a stroke in the left medial/temporal gyrus, resulting in auditory verbal agnosia - the inability to comprehend spoken words, but maintaining the ability to read and write, and with no effects to hearing ability. J.P. showed normal perceptual priming, but his conceptual priming ability for spoken words was, expectedly, impaired. Another patient, N.G., who suffered from prosopanomia (the inability to retrieve proper names) following damage to his left temporal lobe, was unable to spontaneously provide names of persons or cities, but was able to successfully complete a word-fragment completion exercise following priming with these names. This demonstrated intact perceptual priming abilities.

== Cognitive neuroscience ==
=== Perceptual priming ===
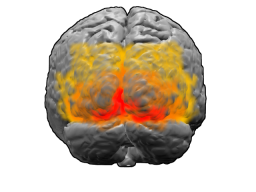
The extrastriate cortex (shown in orange and red) is believed to be involved in perceptual priming.

Priming while improving performance decreases neural processing in the cerebral cortex of sensory stimuli with stimulus repetition. This has been found in single-cell recordings and in electroencephalography (EEG) upon gamma waves, with PET and functional MRI. This reduction is due to representational sharpening in the early sensory areas which reduces the number of neurons representing the stimulus. This leads to a more selective activation of neurons representing objects in higher cognitive areas.

=== Conceptual priming ===
Conceptual priming has been linked to reduced blood flow in the left prefrontal cortex. The left prefrontal cortex is believed to be involved in the semantic processing of words, among other tasks.

The view that perceptual priming is controlled by the extrastriate cortex while conceptual priming is controlled by the left prefrontal cortex is undoubtedly an oversimplified view of the process, and current work is focused on elucidating the brain regions involved in priming in more detail.

== In daily life ==
Priming is thought to play a large part in the systems of stereotyping. This is because attention to a response increases the frequency of that response, even if the attended response is undesired. The attention given to these response or behaviors primes them for later activation. Another way to explain this process is automaticity. If trait descriptions, for instance "stupid" or "friendly", have been frequently or recently used, these descriptions can be automatically used to interpret someone's behavior. An individual is unaware of this, and this may lead to behavior that may not agree with their personal beliefs.

This can occur even if the subject is not conscious of the priming stimulus. An example of this was done by John Bargh et al. in 1996. Subjects were implicitly primed with words related to the stereotype of elderly people (example: Florida, forgetful, wrinkle). While the words did not explicitly mention speed or slowness, those who were primed with these words walked more slowly upon exiting the testing booth than those who were primed with neutral stimuli. Similar effects were found with rude and polite stimuli: those primed with rude words were more likely to interrupt an investigator than those primed with neutral words, and those primed with polite words were the least likely to interrupt. A 2008 study showed that something as simple as holding a hot or cold beverage before an interview could result in pleasant or negative opinion of the interviewer.

These findings have been extended to therapeutic interventions. For example, a 2012 study suggested that presented with a depressed patient who "self-stereotypes herself as incompetent, a therapist can find ways to prime her with specific situations in which she had been competent in the past... Making memories of her competence more salient should reduce her self-stereotype of incompetence."

== See also ==
- Intertrial priming
- Implicit association test
- Priming (media)
- Framing (social sciences)
- Overton window
