= Greenwood function =

Function for correlating hair cells with auditory neurons

The Greenwood function correlates the position of the hair cells in the inner ear to the frequencies that stimulate their corresponding auditory neurons. Empirically derived in 1961 by Donald D. Greenwood, the relationship has shown to be constant throughout mammalian species when scaled to the appropriate cochlear spiral lengths and audible frequency ranges. Moreover, the Greenwood function provides the mathematical basis for cochlear implant surgical electrode array placement within the cochlea.

== Experimental methods and results ==
In 1961, Professor Donald D. Greenwood utilized experimental methods within the field of psychoacoustics to measure the frequency resolution between critical bands within the human cochlea and develop a function correlating the anatomic location of the inner ear hair cells and the frequencies at which they are stimulated (Greenwood 1961a,b).

Georg von Békésy demonstrated physiologically that different frequencies of sound stimulated different regions of the cochlea (Wilson 2004). Based upon the findings of Békésy, Greenwood placed four students under the age of 29 with presumably healthy cochleas in isolation chambers and introduced pure tones within the range of audible frequencies (20-20,000 Hz). Upon application of each tone, he then introduced a second pure tone of the same frequency and then raised and lowered the frequency until it was sufficiently different from the original frequency to become audible (Greenwood 1961a). Subjects responded with a handheld device allowing Greenwood to record exactly at what frequency interval the two pitches were audible and distinct. Experiments were performed over the entire range of audible frequencies (Greenwood 1961a).

== The Greenwood function ==
By summing the experimentally derived critical bandwidths over the length of the human cochlea, Greenwood developed the following function that describes the relationship between the frequency of a pure tone and the position of the hair cells measured as the fraction of the total length of the cochlear spiral in which it resides:

$$f=\int_0^x \! {\Delta f_{cb}} = A(10^{ax}-K)$$

- f is the characteristic frequency of the sound in hertz
- A is a scaling constant between the characteristic frequency and the upper frequency limit of the species
- a is the slope of the straight-line portion of the frequency-position curve, which has shown to be conserved throughout all investigated species after scaling the length of the cochlea
- x is the fractional length along the cochlear spiral measured from the apical end of the cochlea to the region of interest. 0 < x < 1.
- K is a constant of integration that represents the divergence from the log nature of the curve and is determined by the lower frequency audible limit in the species.

== Applications of the Greenwood function ==
The Greenwood function is species-dependent and has shown to be preserved in mammals when normalized to the species-dependent range of auditory frequencies and cochlear spiral length (Greenwood 1990). For humans, the recommended values for the constants are $f=165.4(10^{2.1x}-0.88)$ (Greenwood 1990). According to Greenwood's paper, a = 2.1, if x is relative to the cochlea length, and a = 0.06 if x is calculated in mm.

For individuals with sensorineural hearing loss surgical implantation of a cochlear implant is indicated. The success of a cochlear implant relies in part upon electrode array placement within the cochlea in which the positioning is based on the frequency-spatial relationship empirically described by the Greenwood function. By aligning the electrodes with the positions of the auditory ganglia contacting the basilar membrane as described by the Greenwood function, the cochlear implant electrode array stimulates auditory ganglia associated with the reception of frequencies associated with speech recognition. Electrode array insertion depth is guided by the frequency map created by the Greenwood function, and allows electrical stimulation of neurons involved in stimulating the area of the brain responsible for speech recognition while minimizing ganglia stimulation in noise-generating regions. Well-placed electrode arrays in patients receiving cochlear implants can allow otherwise deafened auditory systems to achieve hearing and recognize speech. (Chivukula et al. 2006, Wilson 2004)

== Greenwood function applied ==
A typical cochlear implant electrode array may be inserted at a depth of 22–25 mm into the cochlea . At an insertion depth of 25mm into the base of the cochlear spiral, the distance from the apex of the cochlea to the deepest electrode is 10 mm using the mean value of 35 mm for the length of a standard human cochlea translating to x=10/35 in the Greenwood function (Greenwood 1990). Therefore, the lowest frequency heard by someone wearing this cochlear implant is calculated by the Greenwood function to be:

$$f=165.4(10^\frac{2.1\cdot10}{35}-0.88)=513 \ \mathrm{Hz.}$$

513 Hz equates roughly to the frequency of a C5 key of a piano. Lower frequency stimulation has been theorized to lead to a greater degree of background noise that impedes rather than aids speech recognition (Wilson 2004).

== See also ==
- Bark scale
- Critical band
- Equivalent rectangular bandwidth
- Mel scale
