= Formant =

Spectrum of phonetic resonance in speech production

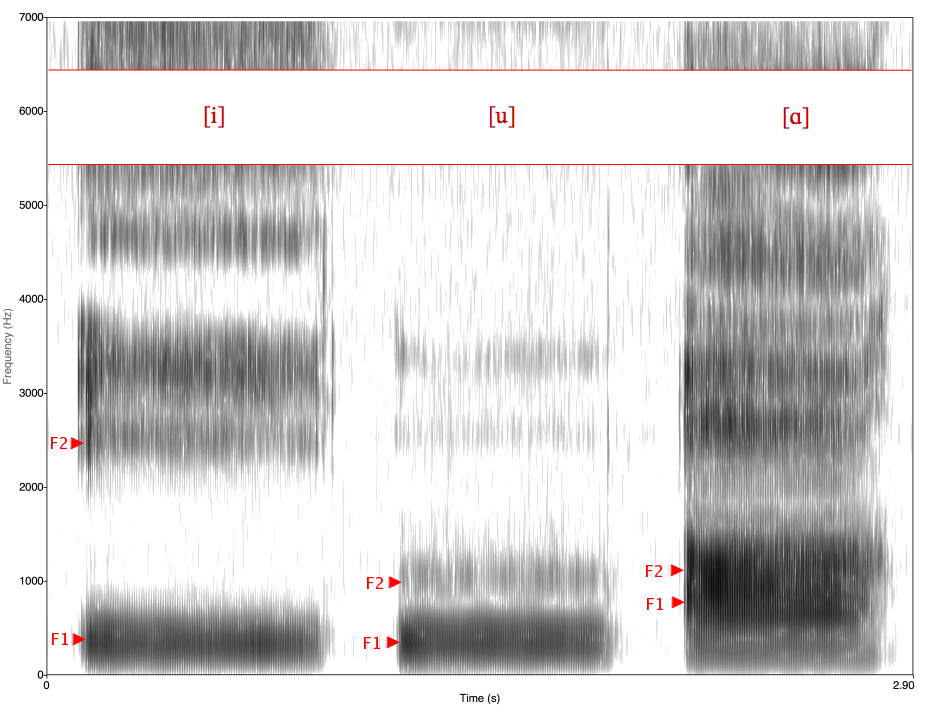
Spectrogram of American English vowels [i, u, ɑ] showing the formants F_{1} and F_{2}

In speech science and phonetics, a formant is the broad spectral maximum that results from an acoustic resonance of the human vocal tract. In acoustics, a formant is usually defined as a broad peak, or local maximum, in the spectrum. For harmonic sounds, with this definition, the formant frequency is sometimes taken as that of the harmonic that is most augmented by a resonance. The difference between these two definitions resides in whether "formants" characterise the production mechanisms of a sound or the produced sound itself. In practice, the frequency of a spectral peak differs slightly from the associated resonance frequency, except when, by luck, harmonics are aligned with the resonance frequency, or when the sound source is mostly non-harmonic, as in whispering and vocal fry.

A room can be said to have formants characteristic of that particular room, due to its resonances, i.e., to the way sound reflects from its walls and objects. Room formants of this nature reinforce themselves by emphasizing specific frequencies and absorbing others, as exploited, for example, by Alvin Lucier in his piece I Am Sitting in a Room. In acoustic digital signal processing, the way a collection of formants (such as a room) affects a signal can be represented by an impulse response.

In both speech and rooms, formants are characteristic features of the resonances of the space. They are said to be excited by acoustic sources such as the voice, and they shape (filter) the sources' sounds, but they are not sources themselves.

== History ==
From an acoustic point of view, phonetics had a serious problem with the idea that the effective length of vocal tract changed vowels. Indeed, when the length of the vocal tract changes, all the acoustic resonators formed by mouth cavities are scaled, and so are their resonance frequencies. Therefore, it was unclear how vowels could depend on frequencies when talkers with different vocal tract lengths, for instance bass and soprano singers, can produce sounds that are perceived as belonging to the same phonetic category. There had to be some way to normalize the spectral information underpinning the vowel identity. Hermann suggested a solution to this problem in 1894, coining the term “formant”. A vowel, according to him, is a special acoustic phenomenon, depending on the intermittent production of a special partial, or “formant”, or “characteristique” feature. The frequency of the formant may vary a little without altering the character of the vowel. For “long e” (IPA /i/) for example, the lowest-frequency formant may vary from 350 to 440 Hz even in the same person.

== Phonetics ==
Average vowel formants for a male voice (in Hz)
Vowel (IPA)	F_{1}	F_{2}	F_{2} – F_{1}
i	240	2400	2160
y	235	2100	1865
e	390	2300	1910
ø	370	1900	1530
ɛ	610	1900	1290
œ	585	1710	1125
a	850	1610	760
ɶ	820	1530	710
ɑ	750	940	190
ɒ	700	760	60
ʌ	600	1170	570
ɔ	500	700	200
ɤ	460	1310	850
o	360	640	280
ɯ	300	1390	1090
u	250	595	345

Formants are distinctive frequency components of the acoustic signal produced by speech, musical instruments or singing. The information that humans require to distinguish between speech sounds can be represented purely quantitatively by specifying peaks in the frequency spectrum. Most of these formants are produced by tube and chamber resonance, but a few whistle tones derive from periodic collapse of Venturi effect low-pressure zones.

The formant with the lowest frequency is called F_{1}, the second F_{2}, the third F_{3}, and so forth. The fundamental frequency or pitch of the voice is sometimes referred to as F_{0}, but it is not a formant. Most often the two first formants, F_{1} and F_{2}, are sufficient to identify the vowel. The relationship between the perceived vowel quality and the first two formant frequencies can be appreciated by listening to "artificial vowels" that are generated by passing a click train (to simulate the glottal pulse train) through a pair of bandpass filters (to simulate vocal tract resonances). Front vowels have higher F_{2}, while low vowels have higher F_{1}. Lip rounding tends to lower F_{1} and F_{2} in back vowels and F_{2} and F_{3} in front vowels. Lowering of F_{3} is also a primary characteristic of r-colored vowels.

Nasal consonants usually have an additional formant around 2500 Hz. The liquid [l] usually has an extra formant at 1500 Hz, whereas the English "r" sound ([ɹ]) is distinguished by a very low third formant (well below 2000 Hz).

Plosives (and, to some degree, fricatives) modify the placement of formants in the surrounding vowels. Bilabial sounds (such as /b/ and /p/ in "ball" or "sap") cause a lowering of the formants; on spectrograms, velar sounds (/k/ and /ɡ/ in English) almost always show F_{2} and F_{3} coming together in a 'velar pinch' before the velar and separating from the same 'pinch' as the velar is released; alveolar sounds (English /t/ and /d/) cause fewer systematic changes in neighbouring vowel formants, depending partially on exactly which vowel is present. The time course of these changes in vowel formant frequencies are referred to as 'formant transitions'.

In normal voiced speech, the underlying vibration produced by the vocal folds resembles a sawtooth wave, rich in harmonic overtones. If the fundamental frequency or (more often) one of the overtones is higher than a resonance frequency of the system, then the resonance will be only weakly excited and the formant usually imparted by that resonance will be mostly lost. This is most apparent in the case of soprano opera singers, who sing at pitches high enough that their vowels become very hard to distinguish.

Control of resonances is an essential component of the vocal technique known as overtone singing, in which the performer sings a low fundamental tone, and creates sharp resonances to select upper harmonics, giving the impression of several tones being sung at once.

Spectrograms may be used to visualise formants. In spectrograms, it can be hard to distinguish formants from naturally occurring harmonics when one sings. However, one can hear the natural formants in a vowel shape through atonal techniques such as vocal fry.

== Formant estimation ==
Formants, whether they are seen as acoustic resonances of the vocal tract, or as local maxima in the speech spectrum, like band-pass filters, are defined by their frequency and by their spectral width (bandwidth).

Different methods exist to obtain this information. Formant frequencies, in their acoustic definition, can be estimated from the frequency spectrum of the sound, using a spectrogram (in the figure) or a spectrum analyzer. However, to estimate the acoustic resonances of the vocal tract (i.e. the speech definition of formants) from a speech recording, one can use linear predictive coding. An intermediate approach consists in extracting the spectral envelope by neutralizing the fundamental frequency, and only then looking for local maxima in the spectral envelope.

== Formant plots ==
A plot of the average formants of a male speaker.

The first two formants are important in determining the quality of vowels, and are frequently said to correspond to the open–close (or low–high) and front–back dimensions (which have traditionally been associated with the shape and position of the tongue). Thus the first formant F_{1} has a higher frequency for an open or low vowel such as [a] and a lower frequency for a closed or high vowel such as [i] or [u]; and the second formant F_{2} has a higher frequency for a front vowel such as [i] and a lower frequency for a back vowel such as [u].

Vowels will almost always have four or more distinguishable formants, and sometimes more than six. However, the first two formants are the most important in determining vowel quality and are often plotted against each other in vowel diagrams, though this simplification fails to capture some aspects of vowel quality such as rounding.

Many writers have addressed the problem of finding an optimal alignment of the positions of vowels on formant plots with those on the conventional vowel quadrilateral. The pioneering work of Ladefoged used the Mel scale because this scale was claimed to correspond more closely to the auditory scale of pitch than to the acoustic measure of fundamental frequency expressed in Hertz. Two alternatives to the Mel scale are the Bark scale and the ERB-rate scale. Another widely adopted strategy is plotting the difference between F_{1} and F_{2} rather than F_{2} on the horizontal axis.

== Singer's formant ==
Studies of the frequency spectrum of trained speakers and classical singers, especially male singers, indicate a clear formant around 3000 Hz (between 2800 and 3400 Hz) that is absent in speech or in the spectra of untrained speakers or singers. It is thought to be associated with one or more of the higher resonances of the vocal tract. It is this increase in energy at 3000 Hz which allows singers to be heard and understood over an orchestra. This formant is actively developed through vocal training, for instance through so-called voce di strega or "witch's voice" exercises and is caused by a part of the vocal tract acting as a resonator. In classical music and vocal pedagogy, this phenomenon is also known as squillo.

== See also ==
- Formant synthesis
- Human voice
- Linear predictive coding
- Praat
- Timbre
- Vocoder
