= Roughness (psychophysics) =

Perceived quality of sound

Roughness is studied by examining how textures are perceived and encoded by an individual's somatosensory system. In an experiment to measure and compare the roughness of different sounds, listeners are presented with different sounds and asked to rate their roughness, for example on a rating scale. Recent research has displayed that there are two different codes, at least, for roughness: a vibrotactile code used for fine surfaces, and a spatial code used for coarse to medium surfaces.

== Details ==
According to psychophysical theory, the roughness of a complex sound (a sound comprising many partials or pure tone components) depends on the distance between the partials measured in critical bandwidths. Any simultaneous pair of partials of about the same amplitude that is less than a critical bandwidth apart produces roughness associated with the inability of the basilar membrane to separate them clearly.

Roughness is physiologically determined and therefore universal, but it is appraised differently in different musical styles. Some musical styles deliberately create large amounts of roughness for aesthetic effect (for example some polyphonic styles in the Balkans in which singers favor simultaneous second intervals) while others try to avoid roughness as much as possible or treat rough sounds in special ways (for example most tonal western music).

In terms of psychophysics, several studies have been done involving a person’s ability to detect the differences between the weight and roughness of objects. A syndrome called Verger-Dejerine syndrome has been known to affect these somatosensory abilities. Patients with this somatosensory cortical loss syndrome commonly display damage to their parietal lobe and it was eventually concluded that it may be that the brain has some form of an asymmetrical organization, as performance in a normal subject shows oblique differences depending on their hand use. However, these patients still exhibit normal or minimally reduced peripheral sensitivity to cold, heat, pain, touch and deep pressure.

Roughness perception is one of the multidimensional scaling of texture perception, which is the judgment of the substance and quality of an object. The studies of roughness perception demonstrate that it is unidimensional, it depends on element height, diameter, shape, compliance, and density; and that the relationship between roughness perception and the physical properties of a surface is complex and nonlinear. Also, there were early observations stated that scanning velocity and contact force between the finger and a surface have minor or no effect on roughness magnitude judgments. The physical determinants of roughness perception are complex, but the evidence is that the neural mechanisms are simple. Furthermore, research performed at the University of North Carolina revealed that scanning velocity did not have an effect on relative roughness because the roughness for all surfaces increase by the same amount as scanning velocity increases in accordance with Weber's Law.

== See also ==
- Auditory masking
- Consonance and dissonance
- Psychoacoustics (Masking effects)
