= Squillo =

Resonant sound in the voices of opera singers

Squillo is the resonant, trumpet-like sound in the voices of opera singers. It is also commonly called "singer's formant", "ring", "ping", "core", and other terms. Squillo enables an essentially lyric tone to be heard over thick orchestrations (e.g., in late Verdi, Puccini and Strauss operas). Achieving a proper amount of squillo in any performing context is imperative: too much and the tone veers towards the shrill; too little and the purpose of the squillo cannot be achieved.

Squillo is recognizable by a distinctive brilliant, ringing quality in the timbre of the voice. This perception is caused by the presence of a peak in the 2–5 kHz frequency range, to which the human ear is particularly sensitive. The amplification of these particular harmonics is believed to be a result of a narrowing of the aryepiglottic fold just above the larynx. Voices with naturally acquired squillo (i.e., having naturally strong higher formants) are especially prized in opera because they allow a singer to sustain lyric qualities such as limpid high notes and consistency of tone throughout the vocal range, even in dramatic singing.

Uses of the squillo include:

- projecting a small timbre e.g. Tito Schipa, Bidu Sayao
- underscoring a dramatically important passage e.g. No, non voglio morir in Sola, perduta abbandonata from Puccini's Manon Lescaut
- singing through a thickly textured orchestration, e.g. the final bars of Libera me from Verdi's Requiem, in which a soprano has to compete against a tutti orchestra and full chorus
- supporting a pianissimo note floated over an orchestra (which also demands a secure breath control) e.g. Montserrat Caballé, Renata Tebaldi, Maria Caniglia, Cristina Deutekom
- supporting a long trill
- simulating a scream without compromising the timbre, especially in a verismic opera (albeit that a bona fide scream is sometimes used in opera, e.g. Tosca's jump to death in Tosca)
- giving an impression of 'youth' to an aged voice, mainly via a cultivation of the head register (cf. Section IX Meine Gesangskunst, by Lilli Lehmann; exemplified vocally by Mirella Freni)

Singers known for their mastery of this technique have included Maria Callas, Kirsten Flagstad, Renata Tebaldi, Giuseppe di Stefano, Jussi Björling and Luciano Pavarotti. Some dramatic singers may also employ squillo rather than volume in the course of a performance, for example Birgit Nilsson.
