= Consonance and dissonance =

Categorizations of simultaneous or successive sounds

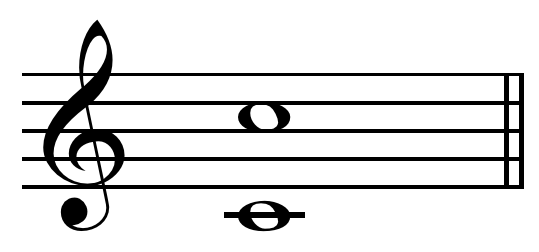
Perfect octave, a consonant interval

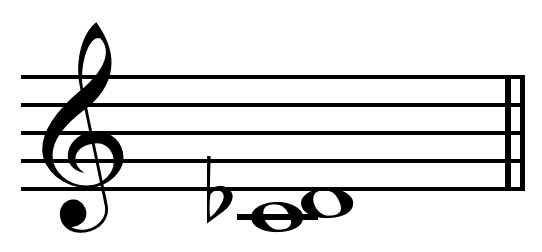
Minor second, a dissonant interval

In music, consonance and dissonance are categorizations of simultaneous or successive sounds. Within the Western tradition, some listeners associate consonance with sweetness, pleasantness, and acceptability, and dissonance with harshness, unpleasantness, or unacceptability, although there is broad acknowledgement that this depends also on familiarity and musical expertise. The terms form a structural dichotomy in which they define each other by mutual exclusion: a consonance is what is not dissonant, and a dissonance is what is not consonant. However, a finer consideration shows that the distinction forms a gradation, from the most consonant to the most dissonant. In casual discourse, as German composer and music theorist Paul Hindemith stressed,

"The two concepts have never been completely explained, and for a thousand years the definitions have varied".

The term sonance has been proposed to encompass or refer indistinctly to the terms consonance and dissonance.

== Definitions ==
The opposition between consonance and dissonance can be made in different contexts:

- In acoustics or psychophysiology, the distinction may be objective. In modern times, it usually is based on the perception of harmonic partials of the sounds considered, to such an extent that the distinction really holds only in the case of harmonic sounds (i.e. sounds with harmonic partials).
- In music, even if the opposition often is founded on the preceding, objective distinction, it more often is subjective, conventional, cultural, and style- or period-dependent. Dissonance can then be defined as a combination of sounds that do not belong to the style under consideration; in recent music, what is considered stylistically dissonant may even correspond to what is said to be consonant in the context of acoustics (e.g. a major triad in 20th century atonal music). A major second (e.g. the notes C and D played simultaneously) would be considered dissonant if it occurred in a J.S. Bach prelude from the 1700s; however, the same interval may sound consonant in the context of a Claude Debussy piece from the early 1900s or an atonal contemporary piece.

In both cases, the distinction mainly concerns simultaneous sounds; if successive sounds are considered, their consonance or dissonance depends on the memorial retention of the first sound while the second sound (or pitch) is heard. For this reason, consonance and dissonance have been considered particularly in the case of Western polyphonic music, and the present article is concerned mainly with this case. Most historical definitions of consonance and dissonance since about the 16th century have stressed their pleasant / unpleasant, or agreeable / disagreeable character. This may be justifiable in a psychophysiological context, but much less in a musical context properly speaking: Dissonances often play a decisive role in making music pleasant, even in a generally consonant context – which is one of the reasons why the musical definition of consonance/dissonance cannot match the psychophysiologic definition. In addition, the oppositions pleasant/unpleasant or agreeable/disagreeable evidence a confusion between the concepts of "dissonance" and of "noise". (See also Noise in music and Noise music.)

While consonance and dissonance exist only between sounds and therefore necessarily describe intervals (or chords), such as the perfect intervals, which are often viewed as consonant (e.g., the unison and octave). Occidental music theory often considers that, in a dissonant chord, one of the tones alone is in itself deemed to be the dissonance: It is this tone in particular that needs "resolution" through a specific voice leading procedure. For example, in the key of C Major, if F is produced as part of the dominant seventh chord (G^{7}, which consists of the pitches G, B, D and F), it is deemed to be "dissonant" and it normally resolves to E during a cadence, with the G^{7} chord changing to a C Major chord.

=== Acoustics and psychoacoustics ===
Scientific definitions have been variously based on experience, frequency, and both physical and psychological considerations. These include:

Numerical ratios
In classical antiquity, these mainly concerned string-length ratios. From the early 17th century onwards, the ratios were more often expressed as the equivalent ratios of frequencies. Consonance often is associated with the simplicity of the ratio, i.e. with ratios of lower simple numbers. Many of these definitions do not require exact integer tunings, only approximation.

Fusion
Perception of unity or tonal fusion between different tones and / or their partials. Tonal fusion occurs when a listener perceives two or more tones as one tone.

Coincidence of partials
With consonance being a greater coincidence of partials. By this definition, consonance is dependent not only on the width of the interval between two notes (i.e., the musical tuning), but also on the combined spectral distribution and thus sound quality (i.e., the timbre) of the notes (see Critical band). Thus, a note and the note one octave higher are highly consonant because the partials of the higher note are also partials of the lower note.

=== Music theory ===
A stable tone combination is a consonance; consonances are points of arrival, rest, and resolution.

— Roger Kamien

An unstable tone combination is a dissonance; its tension demands an onward motion to a stable chord. Thus dissonant chords are "active"; traditionally they have been considered harsh and have expressed pain, grief, and conflict.

— Roger Kamien

Consonances may include:

- Perfect consonances:
  - unisons and octaves
  - perfect fourths and perfect fifths
- Imperfect consonances:
  - major thirds and minor sixths
  - minor thirds and major sixths

Dissonances may include:

- Dissonance
  - major seconds and minor sevenths
  - tritones
  - minor seconds and major sevenths

Ernst Krenek's classification, from Studies in Counterpoint (1940), of a triad's overall consonance or dissonance through the consonance or dissonance of the three intervals contained within. For example, C–E–G consists of three consonances (C–E, E–G, C–G) and is ranked 1 while C–D♭–B consists of one mild dissonance (B–D♭) and two sharp dissonances (C–D♭, C–B) and is ranked 6.

== Physiological basis ==
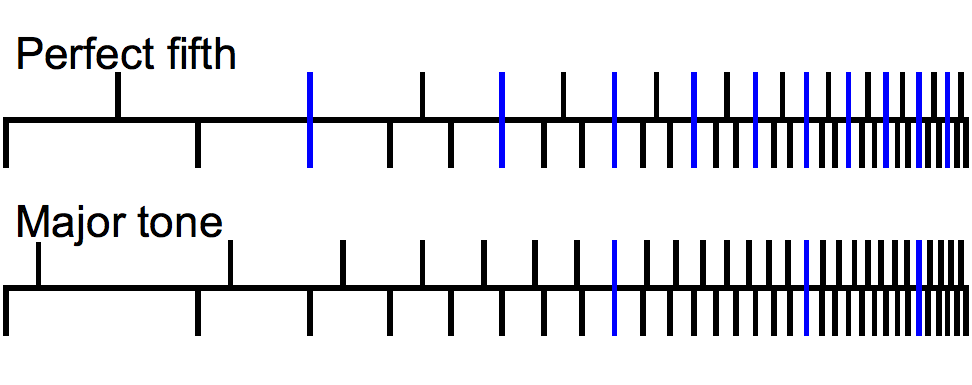
Consonance may be explained as caused by a larger number of aligning harmonics (blue) between two notes. Dissonance is caused by the beating between close but non-aligned harmonics.

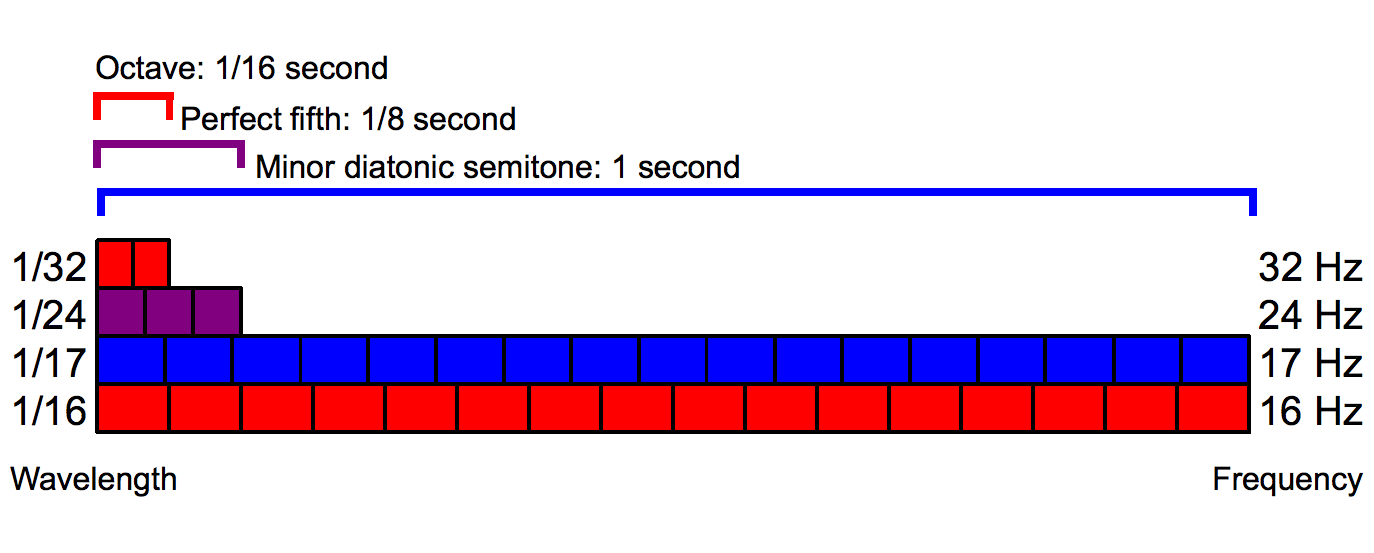
Dissonance may be the difficulty in determining the relationship between two frequencies, determined by their relative wavelengths. Consonant intervals (low whole number ratios) take less time to be determined, while dissonant intervals take more.

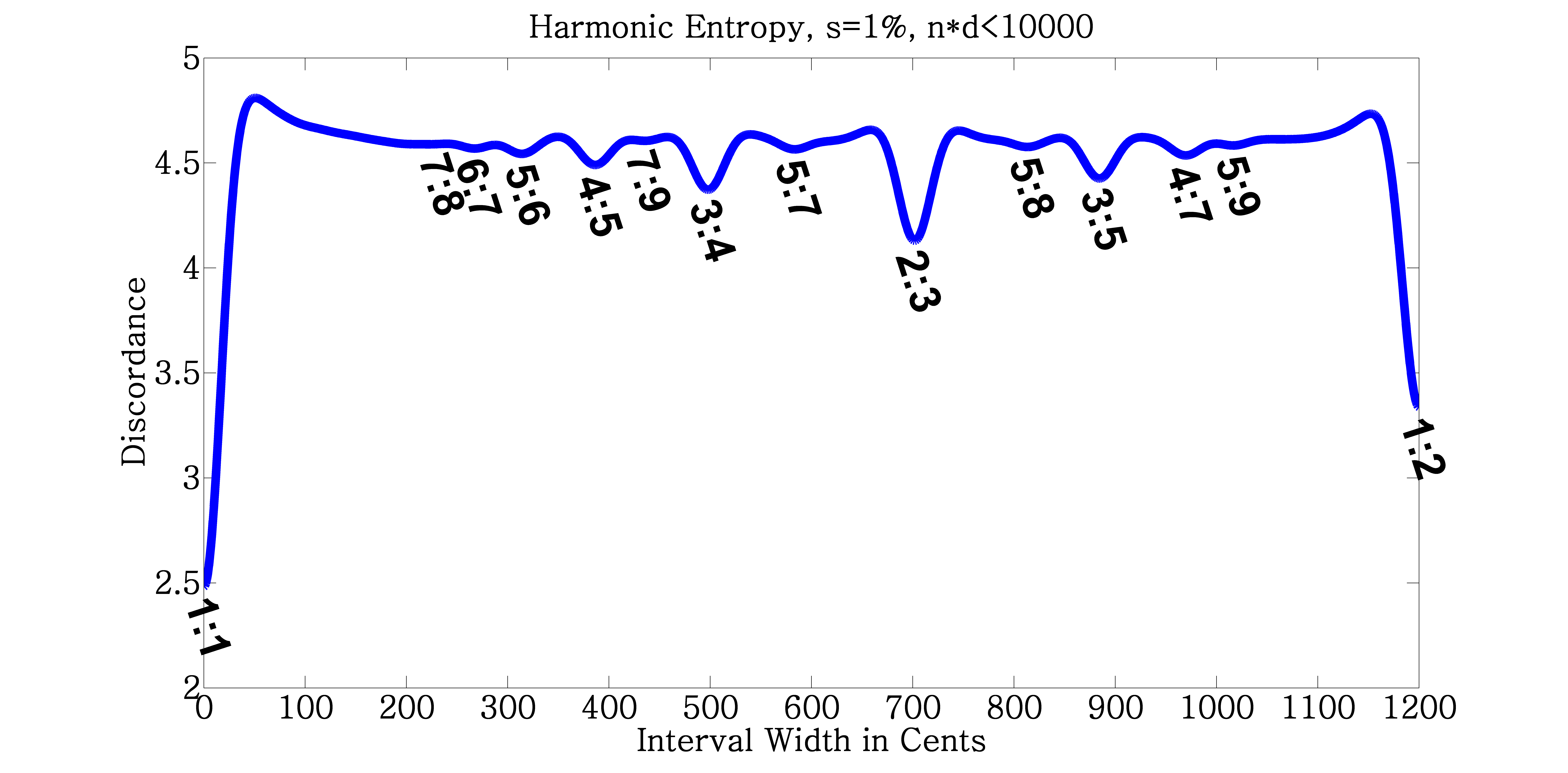
One component of dissonance – the uncertainty or confusion as to the virtual pitch evoked by an interval or chord, or the difficulty of fitting its pitches to a harmonic series (discussed by Goldstein and Terhardt, see main text) – is modelled by harmonic entropy theory. Dips in this graph show consonant intervals such as 4:5 and 2:3 . Other components not modeled by this theory include critical band roughness, and tonal context (e.g., an augmented second is more dissonant than a minor third although in equal temperament the interval, 300 cents, is the same for both).

Two notes played simultaneously but with slightly different frequencies produce a beating "wah-wah-wah" sound. This phenomenon is used to create the Voix céleste stop in organs. Other musical styles such as Bosnian ganga singing, pieces exploring the buzzing sound of the Indian tambura drone, stylized improvisations on the Middle Eastern mijwiz, or Indonesian gamelan consider this sound an attractive part of the musical timbre and go to great lengths to create instruments that produce this slight "roughness".

Sensory dissonance and its two perceptual manifestations (beating and roughness) are both closely related to a sound signal's amplitude fluctuations. Amplitude fluctuations describe variations in the maximum value (amplitude) of sound signals relative to a reference point and are the result of wave interference. The interference principle states that the combined amplitude of two or more vibrations (waves) at any given time may be larger (constructive interference) or smaller (destructive interference) than the amplitude of the individual vibrations (waves), depending on their phase relationship. In the case of two or more waves with different frequencies, their periodically changing phase relationship results in periodic alterations between constructive and destructive interference, giving rise to the phenomenon of amplitude fluctuations.

"Amplitude fluctuations can be placed in three overlapping perceptual categories related to the rate of fluctuation:

1. Slow amplitude fluctuations (≲ 20 per second) are perceived as loudness fluctuations referred to as beating.
2. As the rate of fluctuation is increased, the loudness appears constant, and the fluctuations are perceived as "fluttering" or roughness (fluctuations between about 20 per second and 75–150 per second).
3. As the amplitude fluctuation rate is increased further, the roughness reaches a maximum strength and then gradually diminishes until it disappears (≳ 75–150 fluctuations per second, depending on the frequency of the interfering tones).

Assuming the ear performs a frequency analysis on incoming signals, as indicated by Ohm's acoustic law, the above perceptual categories can be related directly to the bandwidth of the hypothetical analysis filters, For example, in the simplest case of amplitude fluctuations resulting from the addition of two sine signals with frequencies f_{1} and f_{2}, the fluctuation rate is equal to the frequency difference between the two sines | f_{1} − f_{2} | , and the following statements represent the general consensus:

1. If the fluctuation rate is smaller than the filter bandwidth, then a single tone is perceived either with fluctuating loudness (beating) or with roughness.
2. If the fluctuation rate is larger than the filter bandwidth, then a complex tone is perceived, to which one or more pitches can be assigned but which, in general, exhibits no beating or roughness.

Along with amplitude fluctuation rate, the second most important signal parameter related to the perceptions of beating and roughness is the degree of a signal's amplitude fluctuation, that is, the level difference between peaks and valleys in a signal. The degree of amplitude fluctuation depends on the relative amplitudes of the components in the signal's spectrum, with interfering tones of equal amplitudes resulting in the highest fluctuation degree and therefore in the highest beating or roughness degree.

For fluctuation rates comparable to the auditory filter bandwidth, the degree, rate, and shape of a complex signal's amplitude fluctuations are variables that are manipulated by musicians of various cultures to exploit the beating and roughness sensations, making amplitude fluctuation a significant expressive tool in the production of musical sound. Otherwise, when there is no pronounced beating or roughness, the degree, rate, and shape of a complex signal's amplitude fluctuations remain important, through their interaction with the signal's spectral components. This interaction is manifested perceptually in terms of pitch or timbre variations, linked to the introduction of combination tones.

"The beating and roughness sensations associated with certain complex signals are therefore usually understood in terms of sine-component interaction within the same frequency band of the hypothesized auditory filter, called critical band."

Two pitches moving from the interval of a Minor 2nd to a unison
Illustrating the roughness and beat oscillations that gradually reduce as the interval moves towards the unison

- Frequency ratios: When harmonic timbres are played in one of the just intonations (or a sufficiently close approximation thereof), ratios of higher simple numbers are more dissonant than lower ones. However, the farther the timbre departs from the harmonic series, and/or the farther than the tuning departs from a Just Intonation, the less the "frequency ratio" rule applies.

In human hearing, the varying effect of simple ratios may be perceived by one of these mechanisms:

- Fusion or pattern matching: fundamentals may be perceived through pattern matching of the separately analyzed partials to a best-fit exact-harmonic template, or the best-fit subharmonic, or harmonics may be perceptually fused into one entity, with dissonances being those intervals less likely mistaken for unisons, the imperfect intervals, because of the multiple estimates, at perfect intervals, of fundamentals, for one harmonic tone. By these definitions, inharmonic partials of otherwise harmonic spectra are usually processed separately, unless frequency or amplitude modulated coherently with the harmonic partials. For some of these definitions, neural firing supplies the data for pattern matching; see directly below.
- Period length or neural-firing coincidence: with the length of periodic neural firing created by two or more waveforms, higher simple numbers creating longer periods or lesser coincidence of neural firing and thus dissonance. Purely harmonic tones cause neural firing exactly with the period or some multiple of the pure tone.
- Dissonance is more generally defined by the amount of beating between partials (called harmonics or overtones when occurring in harmonic timbres). Terhardt calls this "sensory dissonance". By this definition, dissonance is dependent not only on the width of the interval between two notes' fundamental frequencies, but also on the widths of the intervals between the two notes' non-fundamental partials. Sensory dissonance (i.e., presence of beating or roughness in a sound) is associated with the inner ear's inability to fully resolve spectral components with excitation patterns whose critical bands overlap. If two pure sine waves, without harmonics, are played together, people tend to perceive maximum dissonance when the frequencies are within the critical band for those frequencies, which is as wide as a minor third for low frequencies and as narrow as a minor second for high frequencies (relative to the range of human hearing). If harmonic tones with larger intervals are played, the perceived dissonance is due, at least in part, to the presence of intervals between the harmonics of the two notes that fall within the critical band. The sensory consonance or dissonance of any given interval, in any given tuning, can be adjusted by adjusting the partials in the timbre to be maximally aligned or mis-aligned, respectively, with the notes of the related tuning.
- Dissonance sensation is a result of brain's response to unusual or rare sound perceptions. The brain is remembering and ranking the sound patterns that usually enters the ears, and if an unusual (rare occurring) sound is listened to, a well known EEG pattern emerges (P300/P3b) indicating an oddball event. This causes slight stress in the listener, which is causing the sensation of dissonance. In the same paper, Pankovski and Pankovska show by a software simulated neural network that the brain is capable of such remembering and ranking of the sound patterns, thus perfectly reproducing the well known Helmholtz's list of two-tone intervals ordered by consonance/dissonance, for the first time in the history of studying these phenomena. As a consequence, Pankovski and Pankovska suggest that the consonance and dissonance are biologically dependent for the more consonant sounds, and culturally dependent for the more dissonant sounds.

Generally, the sonance (i.e., a continuum with pure consonance at one end and pure dissonance at the other) of any given interval can be controlled by adjusting the timbre in which it is played, thereby aligning its partials with the current tuning's notes (or vice versa). The sonance of the interval between two notes can be maximized (producing consonance) by maximizing the alignment of the two notes' partials, whereas it can be minimized (producing dissonance) by mis-aligning each otherwise nearly aligned pair of partials by an amount equal to the width of the critical band at the average of the two partials' frequencies.(

The strongest homophonic (harmonic) cadence, the authentic cadence, dominant to tonic (D-T, V-I or V^{7}-I), is in part created by the dissonant tritone created by the seventh, also dissonant, in the dominant seventh chord, which precedes the tonic.

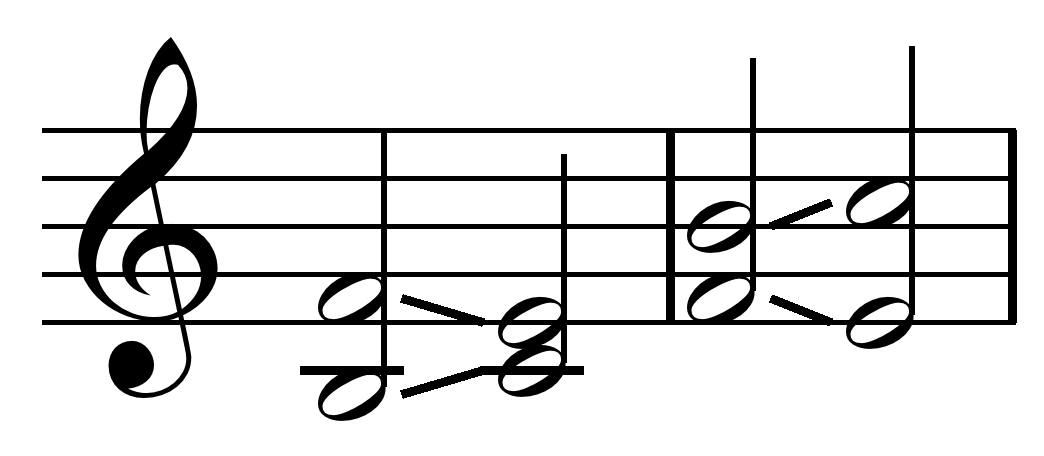
Tritone resolution inwards and outwards Inwards Outwards

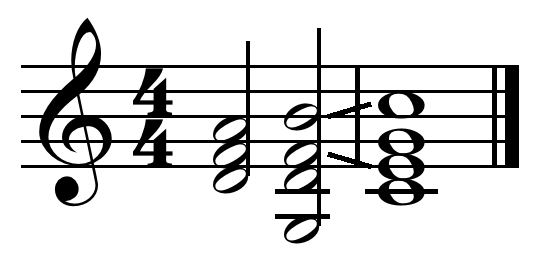
Perfect authentic cadence (V–I with roots in the bass and tonic in the highest voice of the final chord): ii–V–I progression in C

== Instruments producing non-harmonic overtone series ==
Musical instruments like bells and xylophones, called Idiophones, are played such that their relatively stiff mass is excited to vibration by means of a striking the instrument. This contrasts with violins, flutes, or drums, where the vibrating medium is a light, supple string, column of air, or membrane. The overtones of the inharmonic series produced by such instruments may differ greatly from that of the rest of the orchestra, and the consonance or dissonance of the harmonic intervals as well.

According to John Gouwens, the carillon's harmony profile is summarized:

- Consonant: minor third, tritone, minor sixth, perfect fourth, perfect fifth, and possibly minor seventh or even major second
- Dissonant: major third, major sixth
- Variable upon individual instrument: major seventh
- Interval inversion does not apply.

== In history of Western music ==
When we consider musical works we find that the triad is ever-present and that the interpolated dissonances have no other purpose than to effect the continuous variation of the triad.

— Lorenz Mizler 1739

Dissonance has been understood and heard differently in different musical traditions, cultures, styles, and time periods. Relaxation and tension have been used as analogy since the time of Aristotle till the present.

The terms dissonance and consonance are often considered equivalent to tension and relaxation. A cadence is (among other things) a place where tension is resolved; hence the long tradition of thinking of a musical phrase as consisting of a cadence and a passage of gradually accumulating tension leading up to it.

Various psychological principles constructed through the audience's general conception of tonal fluidity determine how a listener will distinguish an instance of dissonance within a musical composition. Based on one's developed conception of the general tonal fusion within the piece, an unexpected tone played slightly variant to the overall schema will generate a psychological need for resolve. When the consonant is followed thereafter, the listener will encounter a sense of resolution. Within Western music, these particular instances and psychological effects within a composition have come to possess an ornate connotation.

The application of consonance and dissonance "is sometimes regarded as a property of isolated sonorities that is independent of what precedes or follows them. In most Western music, however, dissonances are held to resolve onto following consonances, and the principle of resolution is tacitly considered integral to consonance and dissonance".

=== Antiquity and the middle ages ===
In Ancient Greece, armonia denoted the production of a unified complex, particularly one expressible in numerical ratios. Applied to music, the concept concerned how sounds in a scale or a melody fit together (in this sense, it could also concern the tuning of a scale). The term symphonos was used by Aristoxenus and others to describe the intervals of the fourth, the fifth, the octave and their doublings; other intervals were said diaphonos. This terminology probably referred to the Pythagorean tuning, where fourths, fifths and octaves (ratios 4:3, 3:2 and 2:1) were directly tunable, while the other scale degrees (other 3 prime ratios) could only be tuned by combinations of the preceding. Until the advent of polyphony and even later, this remained the basis of the concept of consonance versus dissonance (symphonia versus diaphonia) in Western music theory.

In the early Middle Ages, the Latin term consonantia translated either armonia or symphonia. Boethius (6th century) characterizes consonance by its sweetness, dissonance by its harshness: "Consonance (consonantia) is the blending (mixtura) of a high sound with a low one, sweetly and uniformly (suauiter uniformiterque) arriving to the ears. Dissonance is the harsh and unhappy percussion (aspera atque iniocunda percussio) of two sounds mixed together (sibimet permixtorum)". It remains unclear, however, whether this could refer to simultaneous sounds. The case becomes clear, however, with Hucbald of Saint Amand (c. 900 CE), who writes:

"Consonance (consonantia) is the measured and concordant blending (rata et concordabilis permixtio) of two sounds, which will come about only when two simultaneous sounds from different sources combine into a single musical whole (in unam simul modulationem conveniant) ... There are six of these consonances, three simple and three composite, ... octave, fifth, fourth, and octave-plus-fifth, octave-plus-fourth and double octave".

According to Johannes de Garlandia:

- Perfect consonance: unisons and octaves.

(Perfecta dicitur, quando due voces junguntur in eodem tempore, ita quod una, secundum auditum, non percipitur ab alia propter concordantiam, et dicitur equisonantiam, ut in unisono et diapason.
"[Consonance] is said perfect, when two voices are joined at the same time, so that the one, by audition, cannot be distinguished from the other because of the concordance, and it is called equisonance, as in unison and octave.")

- Median consonance: fourths and fifths.

(Medie autem dicuntur, quando duo voces junguntur in eodem tempore; que neque dicuntur perfecte, neque imperfecte, sed partim conveniunt cum perfectis, et partim cum imperfectis. Et sunt due species, scilicet diapente et diatessaron.
"Consonances are said median, when two voices are joined at the same time, which neither can be said perfect, nor imperfect, but which partly agree with the perfect, and partly with the imperfect. And they are of two species, namely the fifth and the fourth.")

- Imperfect consonance: minor and major thirds. (Imperfect consonances are not formally mentioned in the treatise, but the quotation above concerning median consonances does refer to imperfect consonances, and the section on consonances concludes:

Sic apparet quod sex sunt species concordantie, scilicet: unisonus, diapason, diapente, diatessaron, semiditonus, ditonus.
"So it appears that there are six species of consonances, that is: unison, octave, fifth, fourth, minor third, major third." The last two are implied to be "imperfect consonances" by deduction.)

- Imperfect dissonance: major sixth (tone + fifth) and minor seventh (minor third + fifth).

(Imperfecte dicuntur, quando due voces junguntur ita, quod secundum auditum vel possunt aliquo modo compati, tamen non concordant. Et sunt due species, scilicet tonus cum diapente et semiditonus cum diapente.
[Dissonances] are said imperfect, when two voices are joined so that by audition although they can to some extent match, nevertheless they do not concord. And there are two species, namely tone plus fifth and minor third plus fifth.")

- Median dissonance: tone and minor sixth (semitone + fifth).

(Medie dicuntur, quando due voces junguntur ita, quod partim conveniunt cum perfectis, partim cum imperfectis. Et iste sunt due species, scilicet tonus et simitonium cum diapente.
[Dissonances] are said median when two voices are joined so that they partly match the perfect, partly the imperfect. And they are of two species, namely tone and semitone plus fifth.")

- Perfect dissonance: semitone, tritone, major seventh (major third + fifth). (Here again, the perfect dissonances can only be deduced by elimination from this phrase:

Iste species dissonantie sunt septem, scilicet: semitonium, tritonus, ditonus cum diapente; tonus cum diapente, semiditonus cum diapente; tonus et semitonium cum diapente.
These species of dissonances are seven: semitone, tritone, major third plus fifth; tone plus fifth, minor third plus fifth; tone and semitone plus fifth.")

One example of imperfect consonances previously considered dissonances in Guillaume de Machaut's "Je ne cuit pas qu'onques":

Machaut "Je ne cuit pas qu'onques"

Xs mark thirds and sixths.

According to Margo Schulter:

Stable:

- Purely blending: unisons and octaves
- Optimally blending: fourths and fifths

Unstable:

- Relatively blending: minor and major thirds
- Relatively tense: major seconds, minor sevenths, and major sixths
- Strongly discordant: minor seconds, tritones, and major sevenths, and often minor sixths

"Perfect" and "imperfect" and the notion of being (esse) must be taken in their contemporaneous Latin meanings (perfectum [la], imperfectum [la]) to understand these terms, such that imperfect is "unfinished" or "incomplete" and thus an imperfect dissonance is "not quite manifestly dissonant" and perfect consonance is "done almost to the point of excess". Also, inversion of intervals (major second in some sense equivalent to minor seventh) and octave reduction (minor ninth in some sense equivalent to minor second) were yet unknown during the Middle Ages.

Due to the different tuning systems compared to modern times, the minor seventh and major ninth were "harmonic consonances", meaning that they correctly reproduced the interval ratios of the harmonic series which softened a bad effect. They were also often filled in by pairs of perfect fourths and perfect fifths respectively, forming resonant (blending) units characteristic of the musics of the time, where "resonance" forms a complementary trine with the categories of consonance and dissonance. Conversely, the thirds and sixths were tempered severely from pure ratios, and in practice usually treated as dissonances in the sense that they had to resolve to form complete perfect cadences and stable sonorities.

The salient differences from modern conception:

- parallel fourths and fifths were acceptable and necessary, open fourths and fifths inside octaves were the characteristic stable sonority in 3 or more voices,
- minor sevenths and major ninths were fully structural,
- tritones—as a deponent sort of fourth or fifth—were sometimes stacked with perfect fourths and fifths,
- thirds and sixths (and tall stacks thereof) were not the sort of intervals upon which stable harmonies were based,
- final cadential consonances of fourth, fifths, and octaves need not be the target of "resolution" on a beat-to-beat (or similar) time basis: minor sevenths and major ninths may move to octaves forthwith, or sixths to fifths (or minor sevenths), but the fourths and fifths within might become "dissonant" 5:3, 6:3, or 6:4 chordioids, continuing the succession of non-consonant sonorities for timespans limited only by the next cadence.

=== Renaissance ===
In Renaissance music, the perfect fourth above the bass was considered a dissonance needing immediate resolution. The regola delle terze e seste ("rule of thirds and sixths") required that imperfect consonances should resolve to a perfect one by a half-step progression in one voice and a whole-step progression in another. The viewpoint concerning successions of imperfect consonances—perhaps more concerned by a desire to avoid monotony than by their dissonant or consonant character—has been variable. Anonymous XIII (13th century) allowed two or three, Johannes de Garlandia's Optima introductio (13th–14th century) three, four or more, and Anonymous XI (15th century) four or five successive imperfect consonances. Adam von Fulda wrote "Although the ancients formerly would forbid all sequences of more than three or four imperfect consonances, we more modern do not prohibit them."

=== Common practice period ===
In the common practice period, musical style required preparation for all dissonances, followed by a resolution to a consonance. There was also a distinction between melodic and harmonic dissonance. Dissonant melodic intervals included the tritone and all augmented and diminished intervals. Dissonant harmonic intervals included:

- Major second and minor seventh
- Minor second and major seventh
- Augmented fourth and diminished fifth (enharmonically equivalent, tritone)

Early in history, only intervals low in the overtone series were considered consonant. As time progressed, intervals ever higher on the overtone series were considered as such. The final result of this was the so-called "emancipation of the dissonance" by some 20th-century composers. Early-20th-century American composer Henry Cowell viewed tone clusters as the use of higher and higher overtones. (Note: ... "the natural spacing of so-called dissonances is as seconds, as in the overtone series, rather than sevenths and ninths ... Groups spaced in seconds may be made to sound euphonious, particularly if played in conjunction with fundamental chord notes taken from lower in the same overtone series. Blends them together and explains them to the ear." — Cowell (1969), pp. 111–139)

Composers in the Baroque era were well aware of the expressive potential of dissonance:

Bach Preludio XXI from Well-tempered Clavier, vol. 1

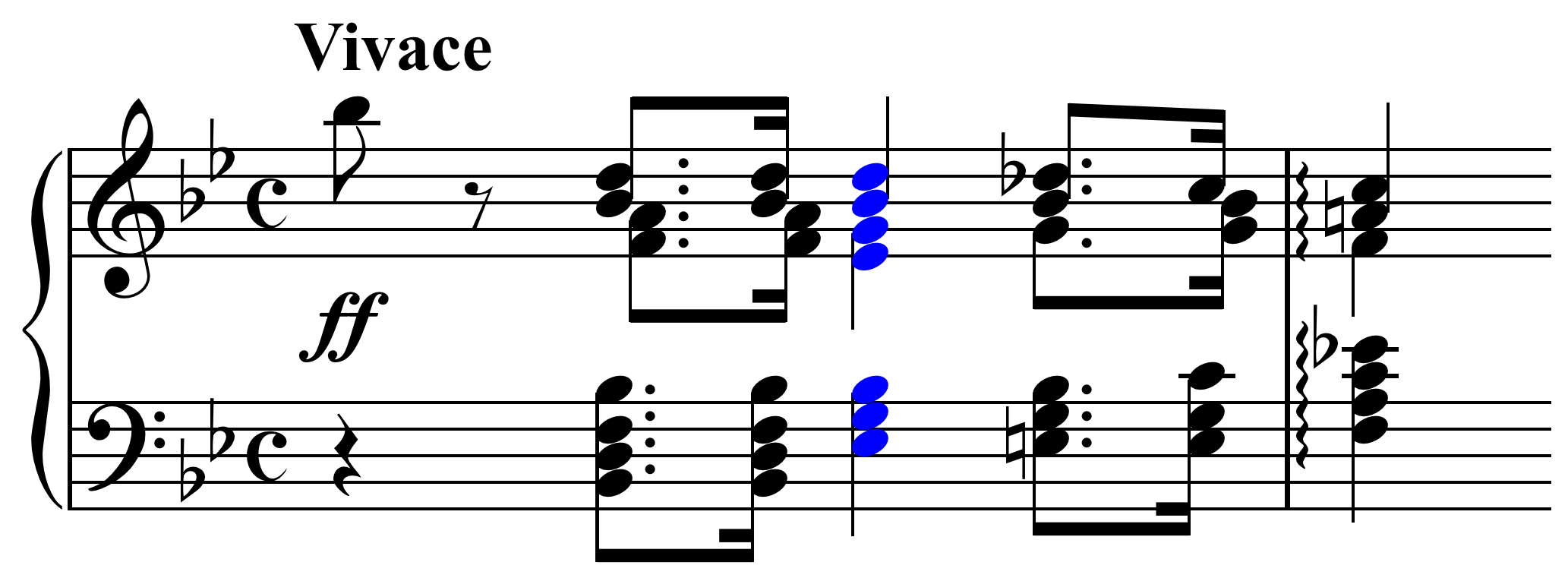
A sharply dissonant chord in Bach's Well-Tempered Clavier, vol. I (Preludio XXI)

Bach uses dissonance to communicate religious ideas in his sacred cantatas and Passion settings. At the end of the St Matthew Passion, where the agony of Christ's betrayal and crucifixion is portrayed, John Eliot Gardiner hears that "a final reminder of this comes in the unexpected and almost excruciating dissonance Bach inserts over the very last chord: the melody instruments insist on B natural—the jarring leading tone—before eventually melting in a C minor cadence."

Bach St Matthew Passion closing bars

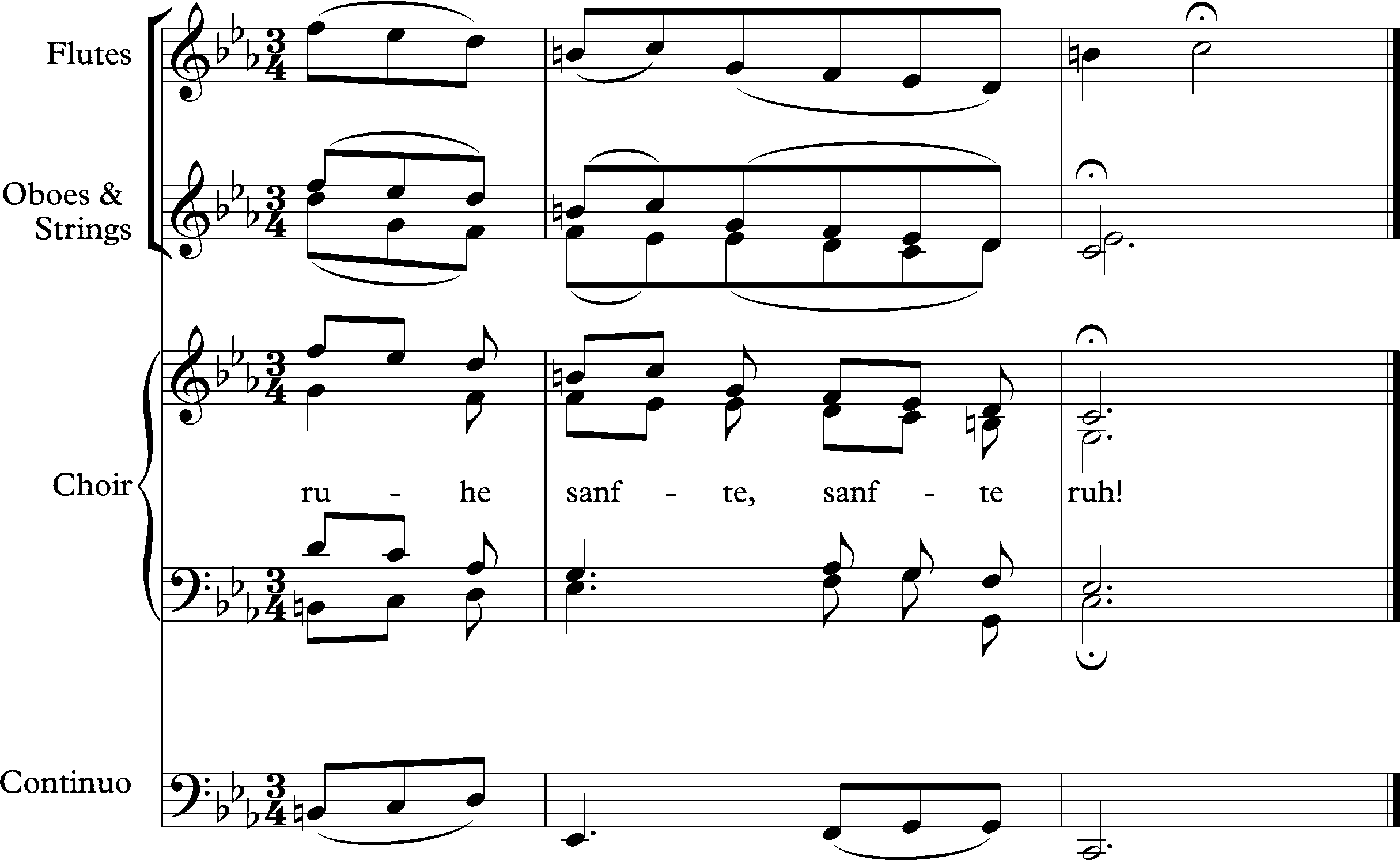
Closing bars of the final chorus of Bach's St Matthew Passion

In the opening aria of Cantata BWV 54, Widerstehe doch der Sünde ("do resist sin"), nearly every strong beat carries a dissonance:

Bach BWV 54 opening bars

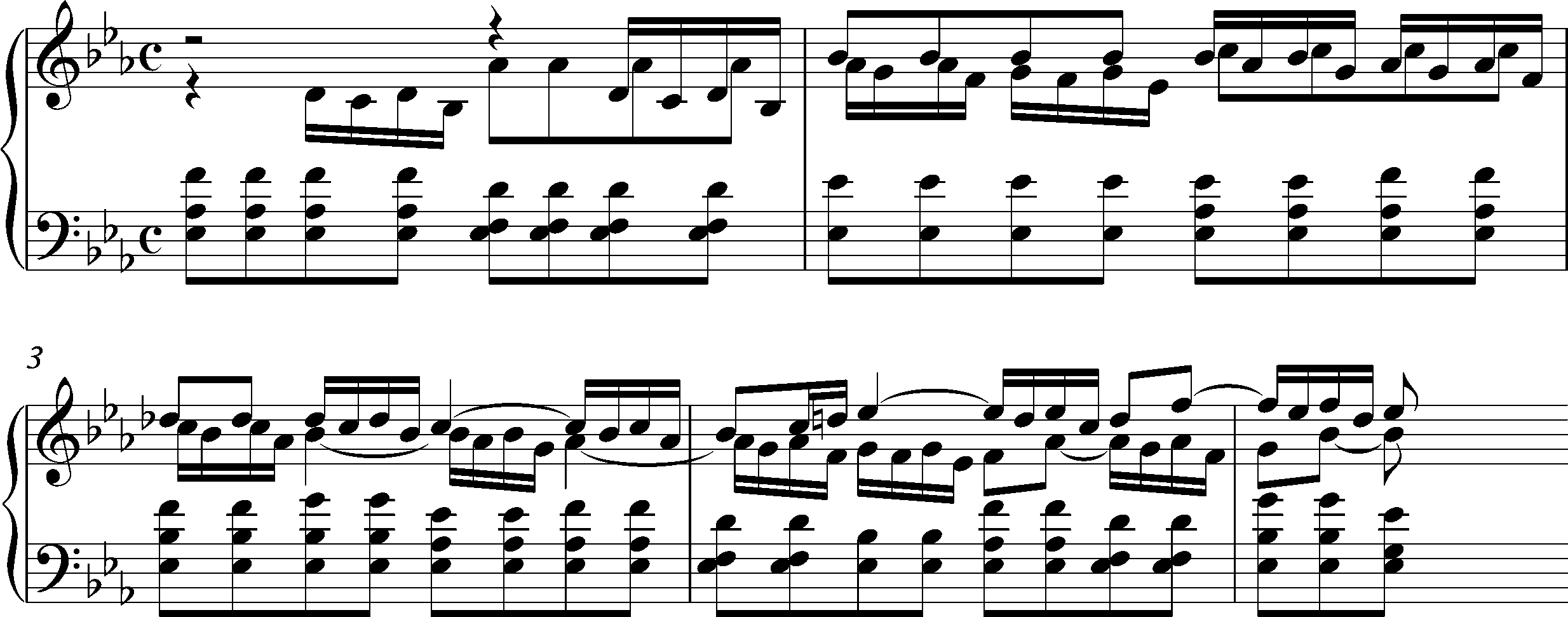
Bach BWV 54, opening bars

Albert Schweitzer says that this aria "begins with an alarming chord of the seventh... It is meant to depict the horror of the curse upon sin that is threatened in the text". Gillies Whittaker points out that "The thirty-two continuo quavers of the initial four bars support four consonances only, all the rest are dissonances, twelve of them being chords containing five different notes. It is a remarkable picture of desperate and unflinching resistance to the Christian to the fell powers of evil."

According to H. C. Robbins Landon, the opening movement of Haydn's Symphony No. 82, "a brilliant C major work in the best tradition" contains "dissonances of barbaric strength that are succeeded by delicate passages of Mozartean grace":

Haydn Symphony 82 1st movement bars 51–63

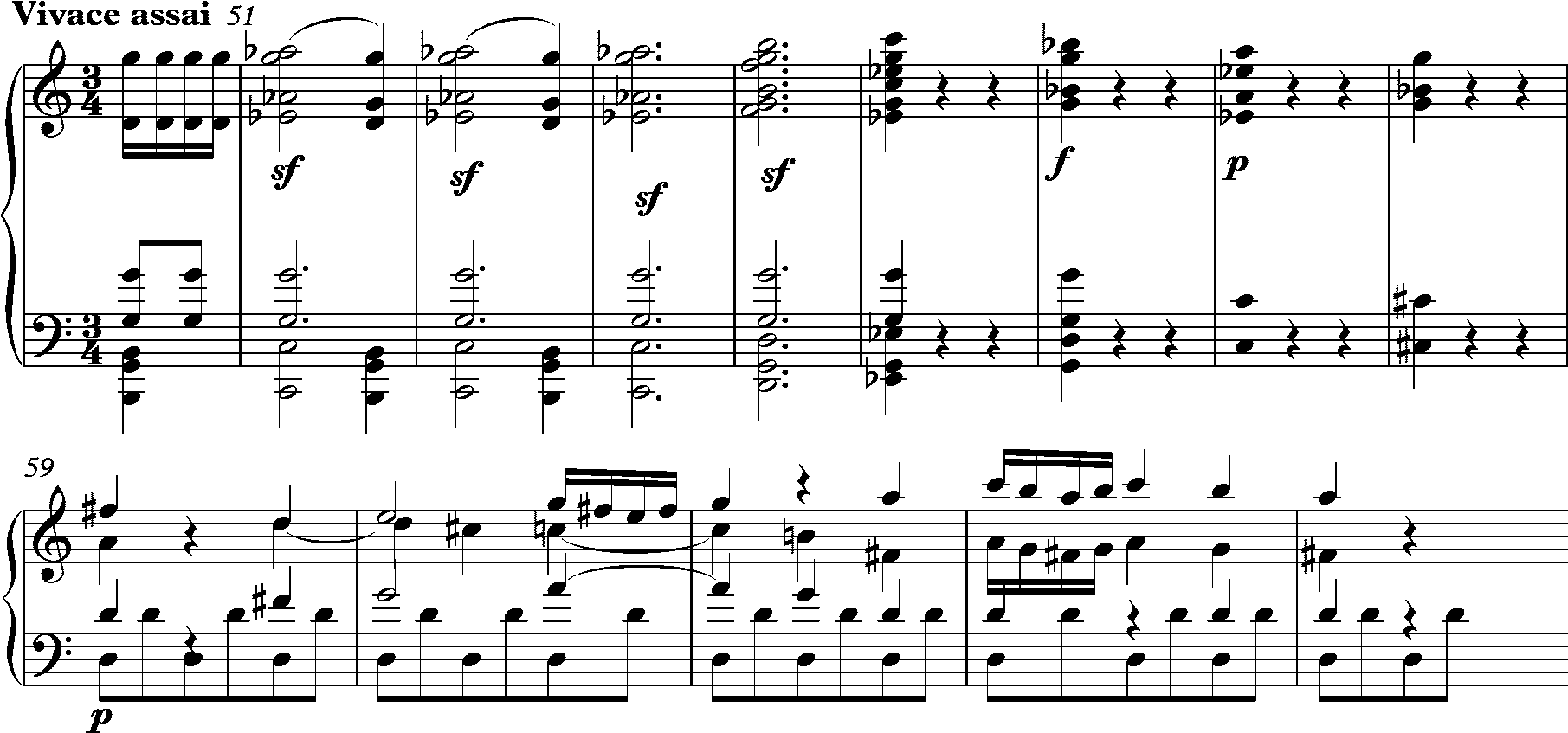
Haydn Symphony 82 1st movement bars 51–64

The Benedictus from Michael Haydn's Missa Quadragesimalis contains a passage of contrapuntal treatment consisting of various dissonances such as a ninth chord without its fifth, an augmented triad, a half-diminished seventh chord, and a minor seventh chord.

Benedictus on YouTube from Michael Haydn's Missa Quadragesimalis, MH 552 performed by Purcell Choir and Orfeo Orchestra conducted by György Vashegyi

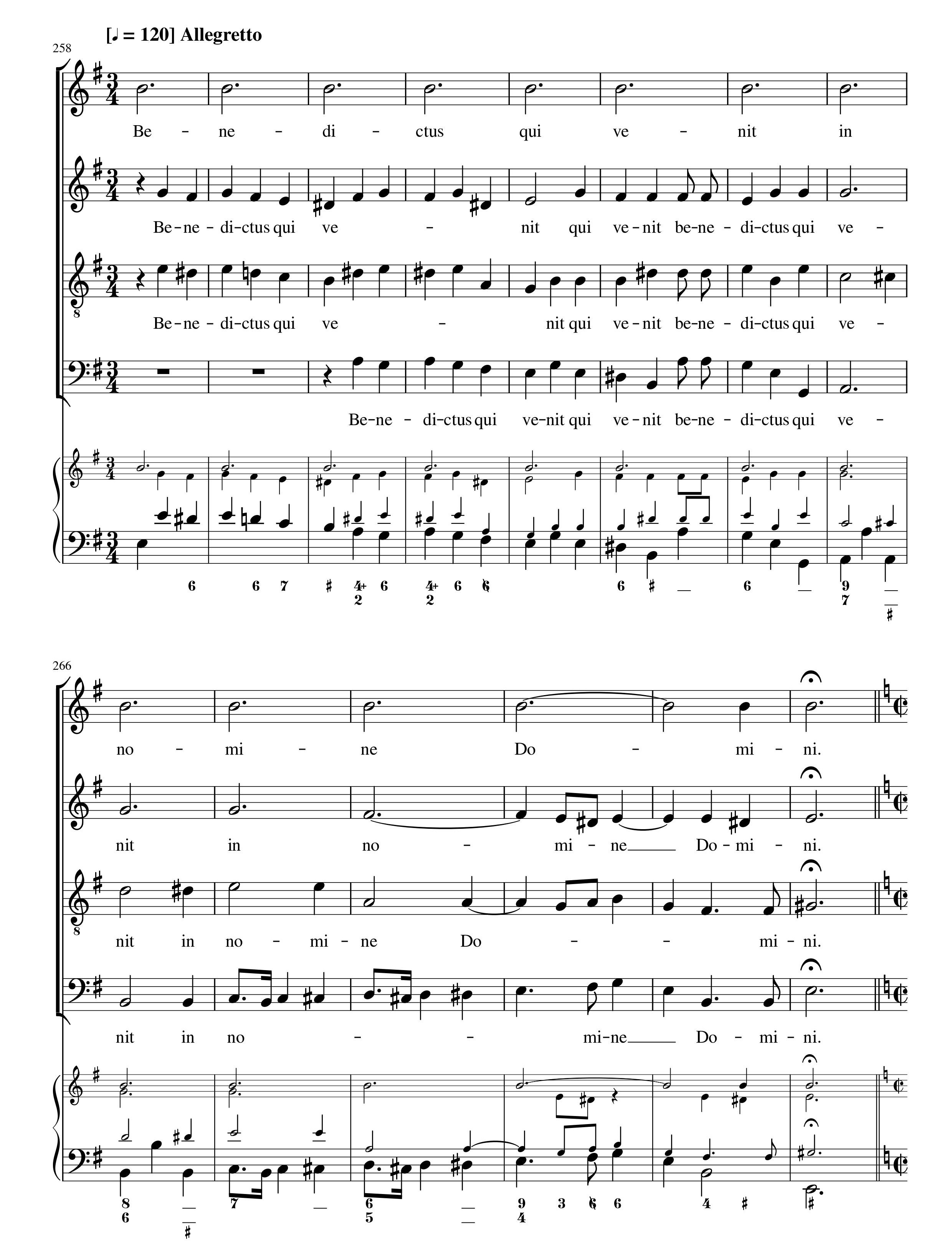
Benedictus from Michael Haydn's Missa Quadragesimalis

Mozart's music contains a number of quite radical experiments in dissonance. The following comes from his Adagio and Fugue in C minor, K. 546:

Dissonance in Mozart's Adagio and Fugue in C minor, K. 546

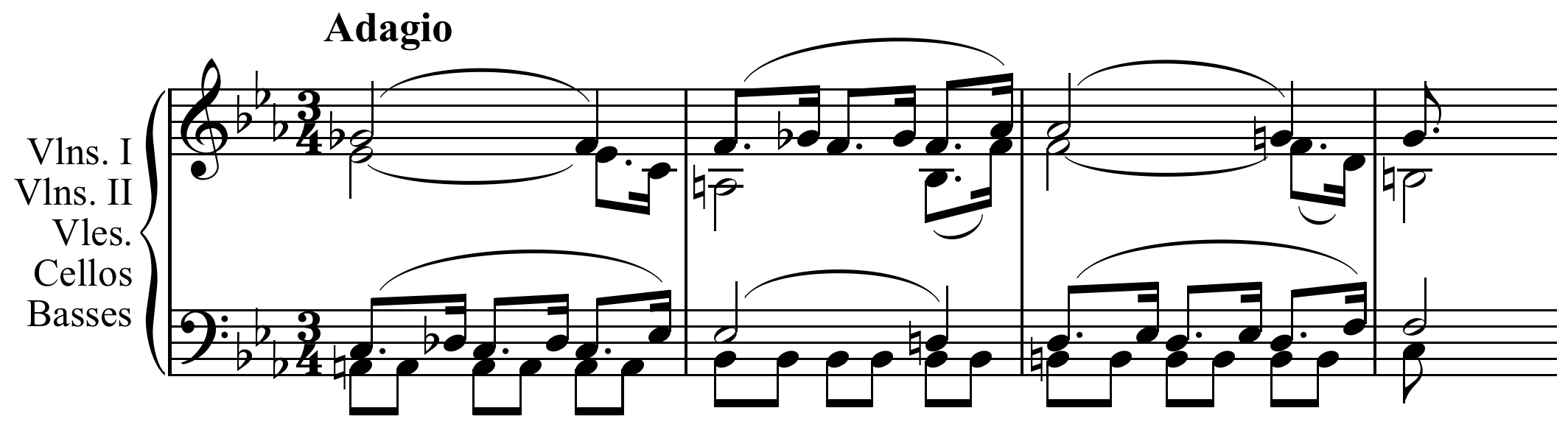
Dissonance in Mozart's Adagio and Fugue in C minor, K. 546

Mozart's Quartet in C major, K465 opens with an adagio introduction that gave the work its nickname, the "Dissonance Quartet":

Mozart Dissonance Quartet opening bars

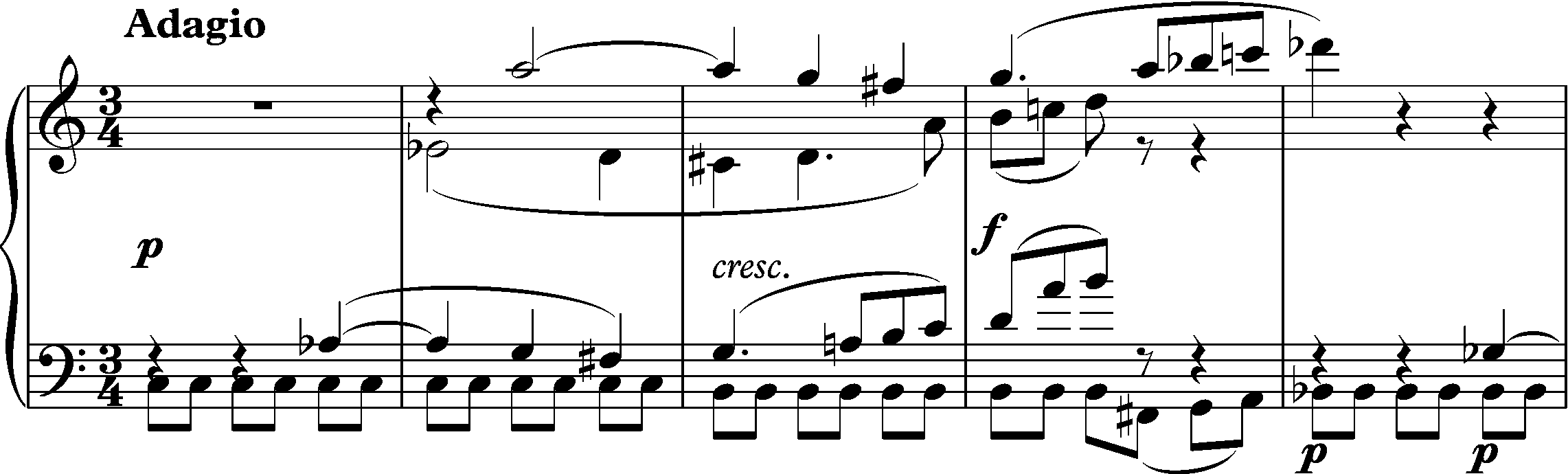
Mozart Dissonance Quartet opening bars

There are several passing dissonances in this adagio passage, for example on the first beat of bar 3. However the most striking effect here is implied, rather than sounded explicitly. The A flat in the first bar is contradicted by the high A natural in the second bar, but these notes do not sound together as a discord. (See also False relation.)

An even more famous example from Mozart comes in a magical passage from the slow movement of his popular "Elvira Madigan" Piano Concerto 21, K467, where the subtle, but quite explicit dissonances on the first beats of each bar are enhanced by exquisite orchestration:

Mozart, from Piano Concerto No. 21, 2nd movement bars 12–17

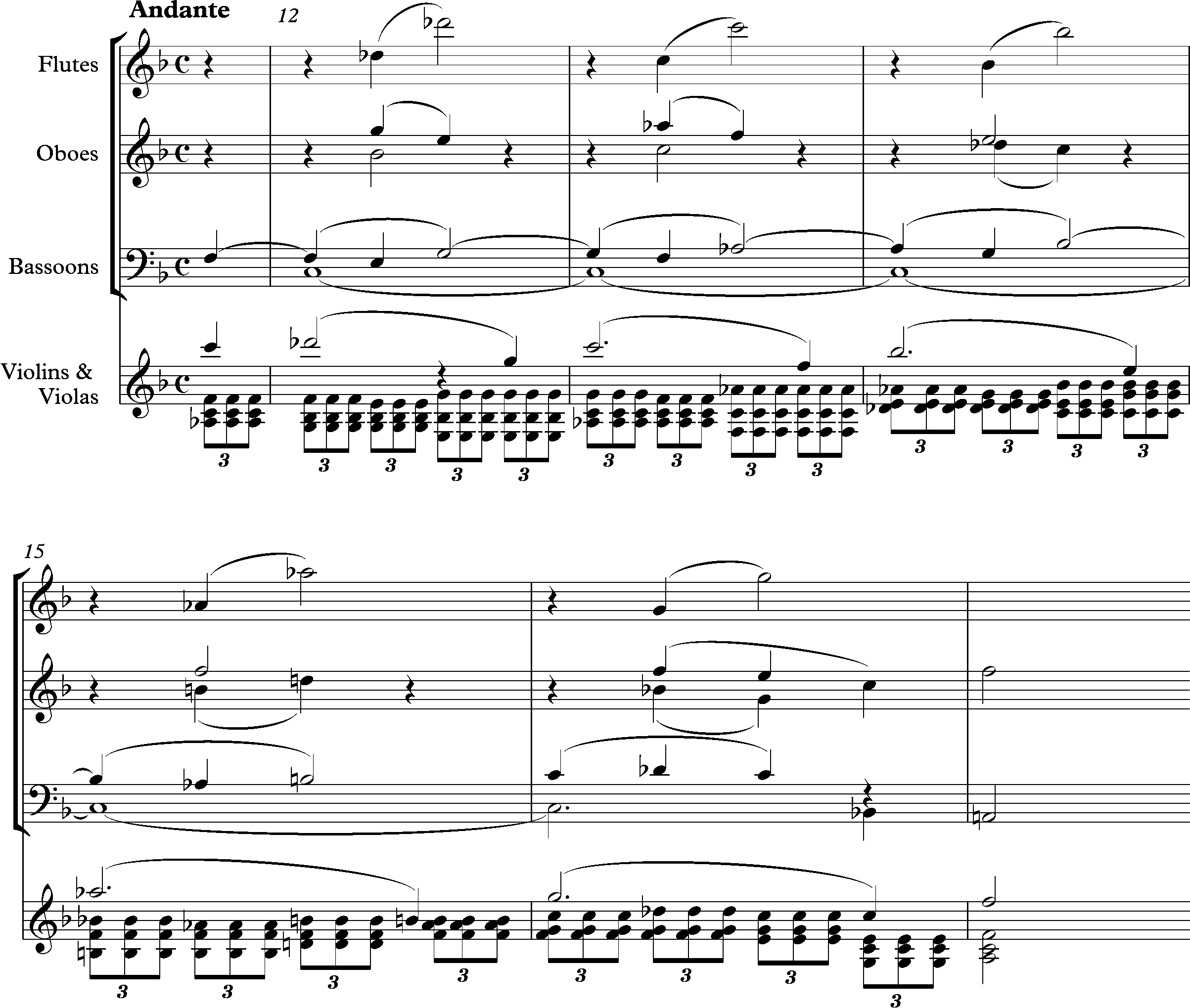
Mozart Piano Concerto 21, 2nd movement bars 12–17

Philip Radcliffe speaks of this as "a remarkably poignant passage with surprisingly sharp dissonances". Radcliffe says that the dissonances here "have a vivid foretaste of Schumann and the way they gently melt into the major key is equally prophetic of Schubert." Eric Blom says that this movement must have "made Mozart's hearers sit up by its daring modernities... There is a suppressed feeling of discomfort about it."

The finale of Beethoven's Symphony No. 9 opens with a startling discord, consisting of a B flat inserted into a D minor chord:

Beethoven Symphony No. 9, finale opening bars

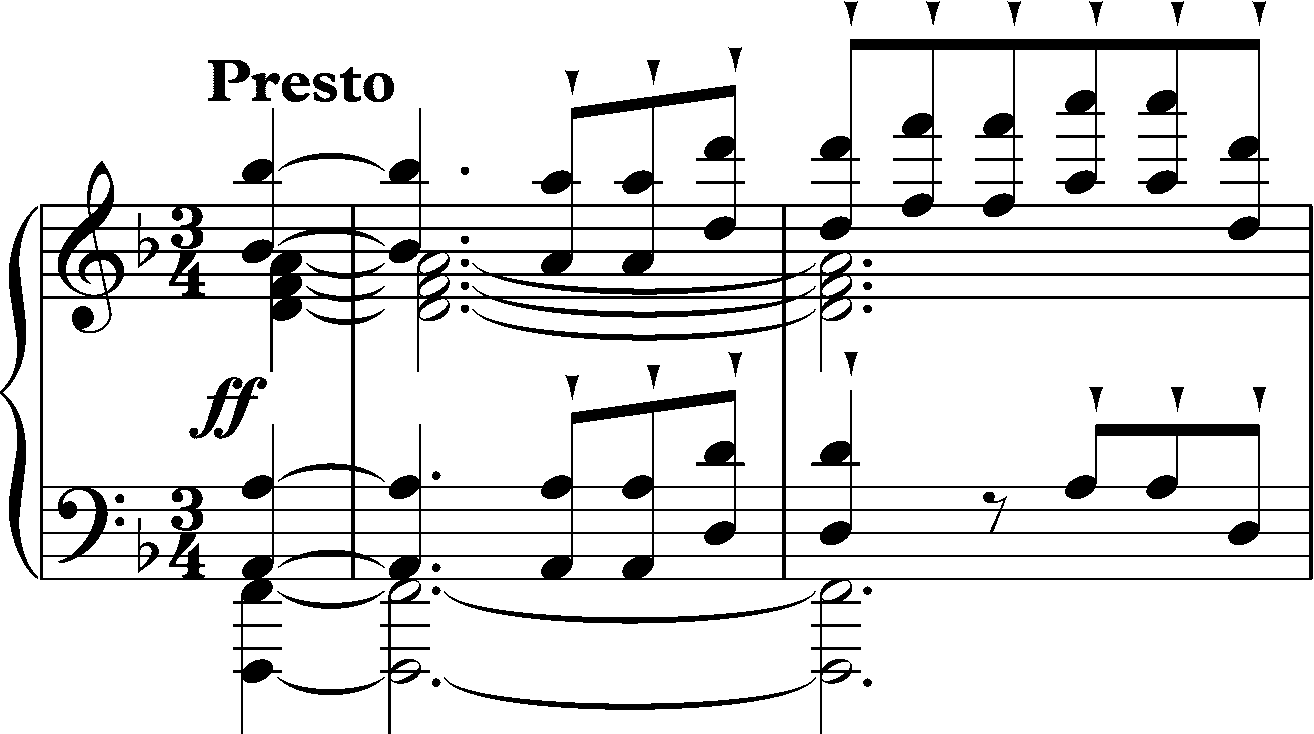
Beethoven Symphony No. 9, finale, opening bars

Roger Scruton alludes to Wagner's description of this chord as introducing "a huge Schreckensfanfare—horror fanfare." When this passage returns later in the same movement (just before the voices enter) the sound is further complicated with the addition of a diminished seventh chord, creating, in Scruton's words "the most atrocious dissonance that Beethoven ever wrote, a first inversion D-minor triad containing all the notes of the D minor harmonic scale":

Beethoven Symphony No. 9, finale bars 208ff

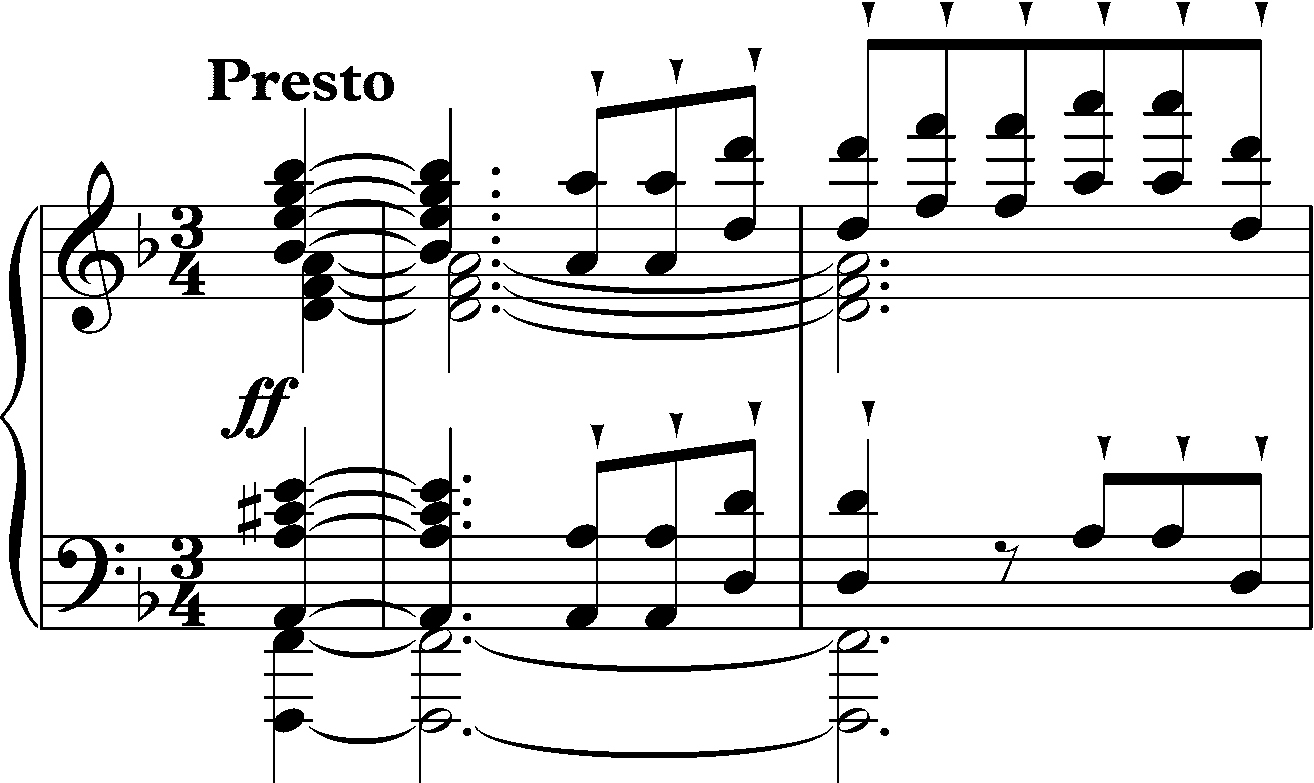
Beethoven, Symphony No. 9, finale, bars 208-210

Robert Schumann's song "Auf einer Burg" from his cycle Liederkreis, Op. 39, climaxes on a striking dissonance in the fourteenth bar. As Nicholas Cook points out, this is "the only chord in the whole song that Schumann marks with an accent". Cook goes on to stress that what makes this chord so effective is Schumann's placing of it in its musical context: "in what leads up to it and what comes of it". Cook explains further how the interweaving of lines in both piano and voice parts in the bars leading up to this chord (bars 9–14) "are set on a kind of collision course; hence the feeling of tension rising steadily to a breaking point".

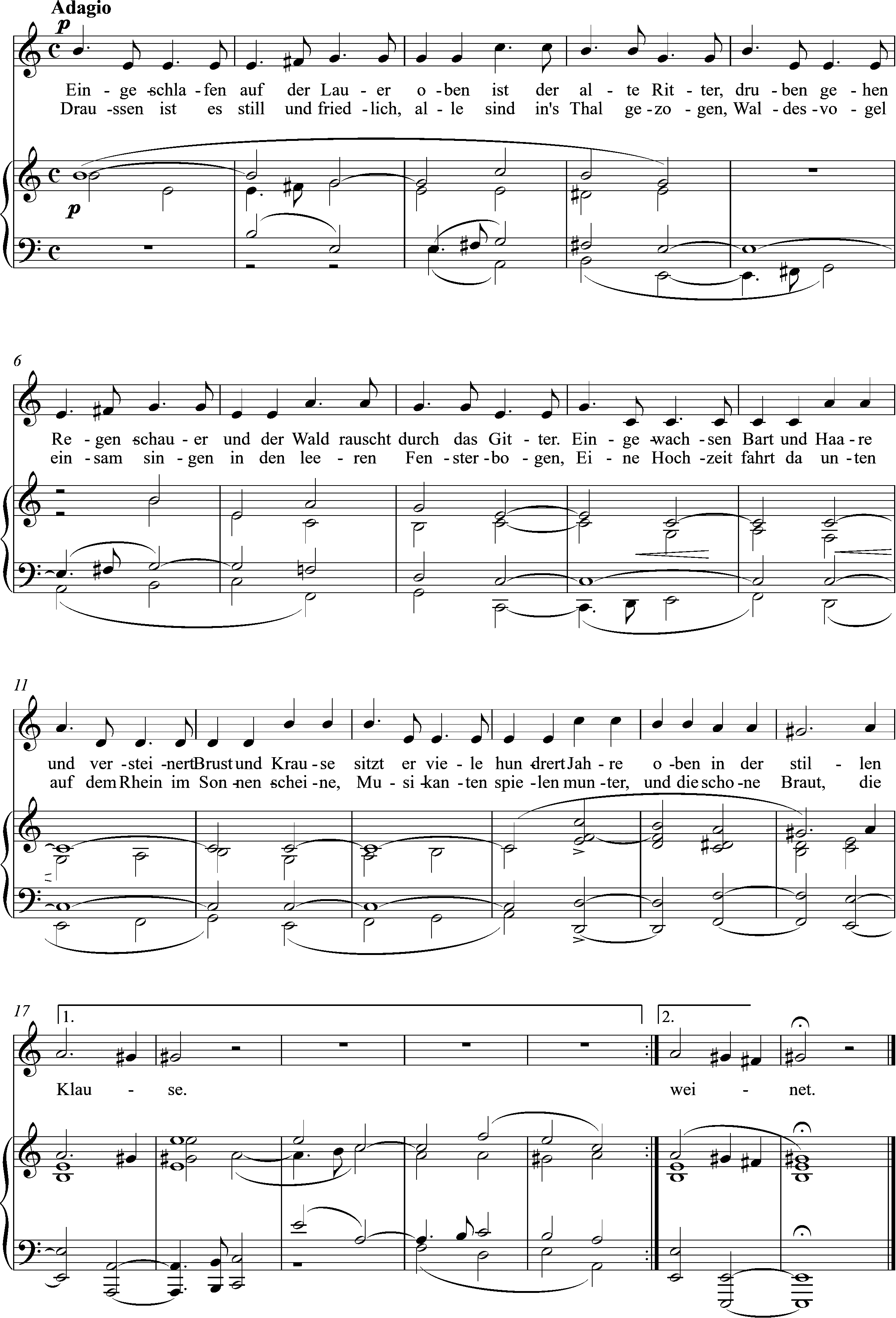
Schumann Auf einer Burg. Listen

Wagner made increasing use of dissonance for dramatic effect as his style developed, particularly in his later operas. In the scene known as "Hagen's Watch" from the first act of Götterdämmerung, according to Scruton the music conveys a sense of "matchless brooding evil", and the excruciating dissonance in bars 9–10 below it constitute "a semitonal wail of desolation".

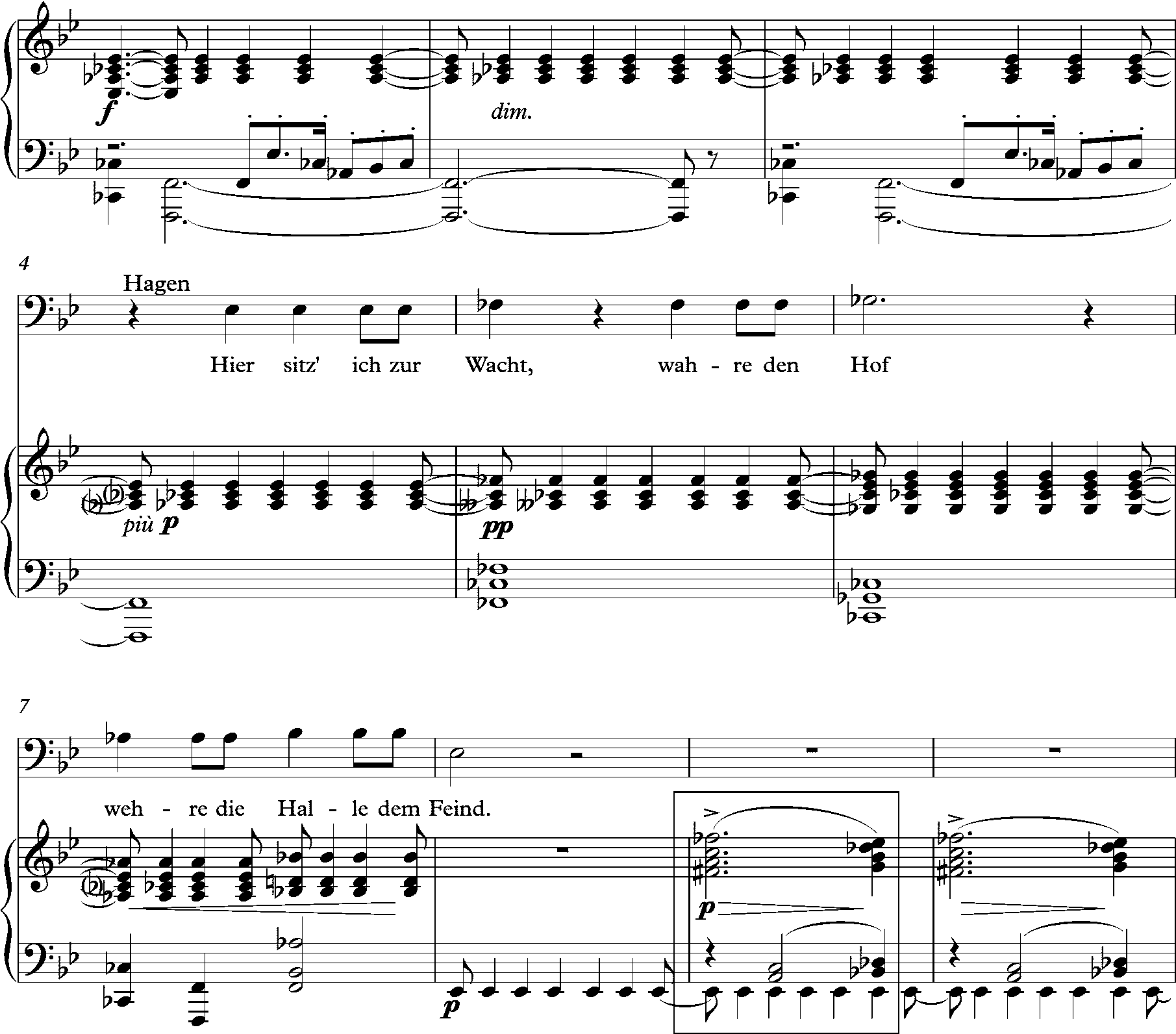
Wagner, Hagen's Watch from act 1 of Götterdämmerung. Listen

Another example of a cumulative build-up of dissonance from the early 20th century (1910) can be found in the Adagio that opens Gustav Mahler's unfinished 10th Symphony:

Mahler Symphony No. 10 Adagio bars 201–213

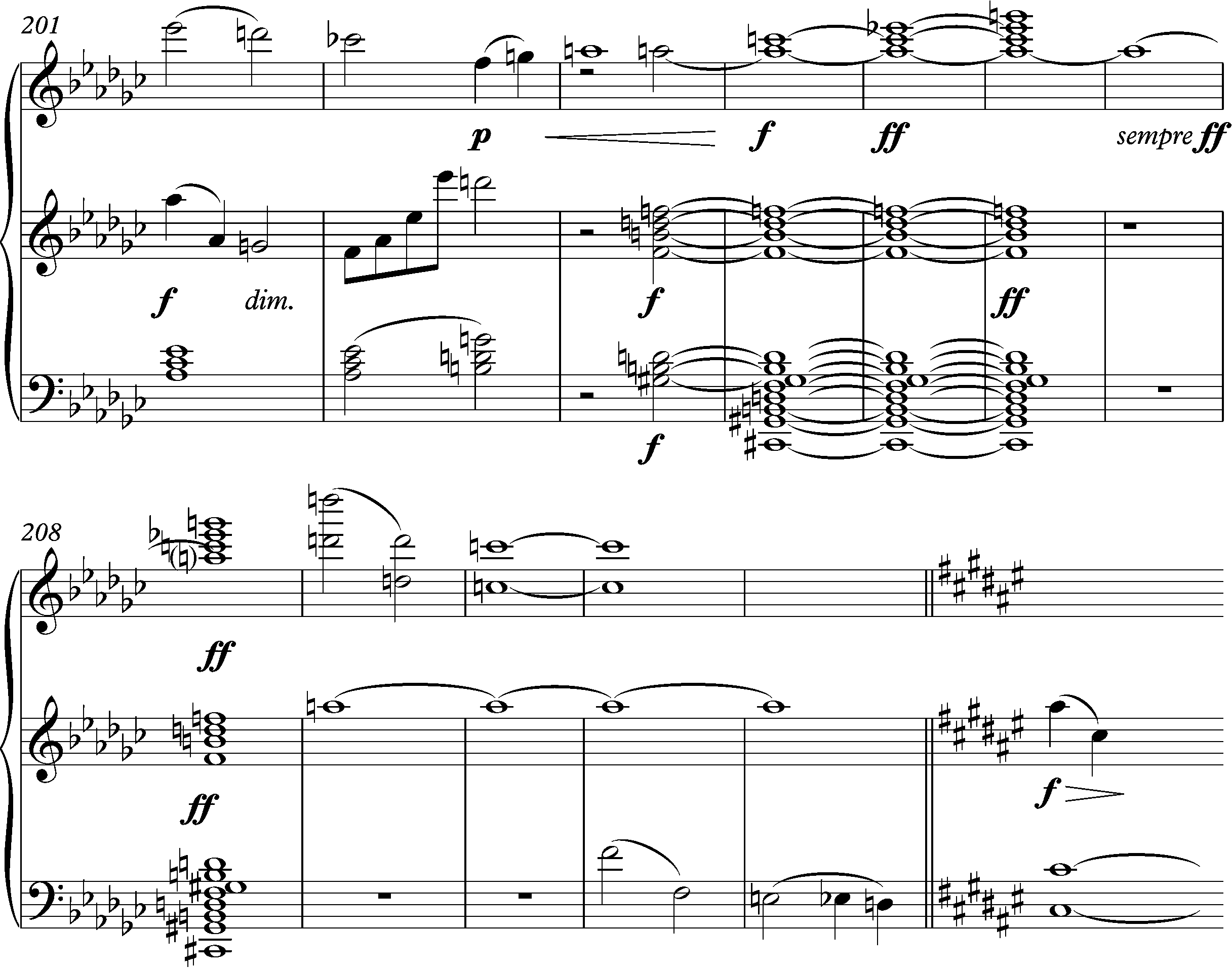
Mahler Symphony 10, opening Adagio, bars 201–213

Richard Taruskin parsed this chord (in bars 206 and 208) as a "diminished nineteenth ... a searingly dissonant dominant harmony containing nine different pitches. Who knows what Guido Adler, for whom the second and Third Symphonies already contained 'unprecedented cacophonies', might have called it?"

One example of modernist dissonance comes from a work that received its first performance in 1913, three years after the Mahler:

Igor Stravinsky's The Rite of Spring, "Sacrificial Dance" excerpt

=== Neo-classic harmonic consonance theory ===
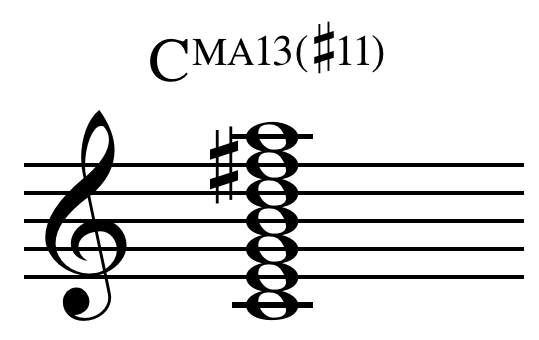
Thirteenth chord constructed from notes of the Lydian mode

George Russell, in his 1953 Lydian Chromatic Concept of Tonal Organization, presents a slightly different view from classical practice, one widely taken up in Jazz. He regards the tritone over the tonic as a rather consonant interval due to its derivation from the Lydian dominant thirteenth chord.

In effect, he returns to a Medieval consideration of "harmonic consonance": that intervals when not subject to octave equivalence (at least not by contraction) and correctly reproducing the mathematical ratios of the harmonic series are truly non-dissonant. Thus the septimal minor seventh, major ninth, neutral eleventh (semiaugmented fourth), neutral thirteenth, and diminished fifteenth must necessarily be consonant.

Most of these pitches exist only in a universe of microtones smaller than a halfstep; notice also that we already freely take the flat (minor) seventh note for the just seventh of the harmonic series in chords. Russell extends by approximation the virtual merits of harmonic consonance to the 12TET tuning system of Jazz and the 12-note octave of the piano, granting consonance to the sharp eleventh note (approximating the harmonic eleventh), that accidental being the sole pitch difference between the major scale and the Lydian mode.

(In another sense, that Lydian scale representing the provenance of the tonic chord (with major seventh and sharp fourth) replaces or supplements the Mixolydian scale of the dominant chord (with minor seventh and natural fourth) as the source from which to derive extended tertian harmony.)

Dan Haerle, in his 1980 The Jazz Language, extends the same idea of harmonic consonance and intact octave displacement to alter Paul Hindemith's Series 2 gradation table from The Craft of Musical Composition. In contradistinction to Hindemith, whose scale of consonance and dissonance is currently the de facto standard, Haerle places the minor ninth as the most dissonant interval of all, more dissonant than the minor second to which it was once considered by all as octave-equivalent. He also promotes the tritone from most-dissonant position to one just a little less consonant than the perfect fourth and perfect fifth.

For context: unstated in these theories is that musicians of the Romantic Era had effectively promoted the major ninth and minor seventh to a legitimacy of harmonic consonance as well, in their fabrics of 4-note chords.

== See also ==
- Inharmonicity
- Chord factor
- Dissonant counterpoint
- Limit (music)
- Phonaesthetics

== Sources ==
- Aristoxenus (1902). Macran, H. Stewart (ed.). Harmonics. Oxford, UK: Clarendon Press – via archive.org.
- Babb, Warren (1978). Hucbald, Guido and John on Music. New Haven, CT / London, UK: Yale University Press.
- Benward, Bruce, and Marilyn Saker (2003). Music: In Theory and Practice, Vol. I., seventh edition. New York: McGraw-Hill Higher Education. ISBN 978-0-07-294262-0.
- Blom, Eric (1935). Mozart. London, UK: Dent.
- Boethius, Anicius (n.d.). De institutione musica, vol. I, Ms Cambridge, Trinity College, R.15.22 (944), f. 13v. Electronic edition on CHTML.
- Butler, David, and Burdette Green (2002). "From Acoustics to Tonpsychologie". In The Cambridge History of Western Music Theory, edited by Thomas Christensen, 246–271. The Cambridge History of Music 3. Cambridge and New York: Cambridge University Press. ISBN 9780521623711.
- Christensen, Thomas (2002). "Introduction". The Cambridge History of Western Music Theory. Cambridge: Cambridge University Press. ISBN 9780521623711.
- Cowell, Henry (1969). New Musical Resources. New York: Something Else Press. [ISBN unspecified].
- Dahlhaus, Carl (1990). Studies in the Origin of Harmonic Tonality, translated by Robert O. Gjerdigan. Princeton: Princeton University Press. ISBN 0-691-09135-8.
- Cook, Nicholas (1987). A Guide to Musical Analysis. London, UK: Dent.
- Forte, Allen. (1979). Tonal Harmony in Concept and Practice, third edition. New York: Holt, Rinehart and Winston, ISBN 0-03-020756-8.
- Gardiner, John Eliot (2013). Music in the Castle of Heaven: A portrait of Johann Sebastian Bach. London, UK: Allen Lane.
- Gerbert, Martin (1784). Scriptores ecclesiastici de musica sacra potissimum: ex variis Italiae, Galliae & Germaniae codicibus manuscriptis, 3 vols. [n.p.]: Typis San-Blasianis. Reprinted, Hildesheim: G. Olms, 1963. [GS]
- Gerson, A., and J. L. Goldstein (1978). "Evidence for a General Template in Central Optimal Processing for Pitch of Complex Tones". Journal of the Acoustical Society of America 63:498–510.
- Gouwens, John (2009). Composing for the Carillon. Culver IN: Culver Academy Press.
- Haerle, Dan (1980). The Jazz Language: A Theory Text for Jazz Composition and Improvisation. [S.l.]: Studio 224. ISBN 0-7604-0014-8.
- Helmholtz, H.L.F. (1954a) [1877]. On the Sensations of Tone. Translated by Ellis, Alexander J. (from 4th German ed.). New York, NY: Dover.
- Helmholtz, H.L.F. (1954b) [1877, 1885]. Die Lehre von den Tonempfindungen [On the Sensations of Tone as a Physiological Basis for the Theory of Music] (in German). Translated by Ellis, A.J. (2nd English / 4th German ed.). New York, NY: Dover Publications.
- Hindemith, Paul (1937–70). Unterweisung im Tonsatz (in German). Vol. 1–3. Mainz, DE: B. Schott's Söhne.
- Hindemith, Paul (1942). The Craft of Musical Composition. Vol. I. Translated by Mendel, Arthur. New York, NY: Associated Music Publishers.
- Hucbald of Saint-Amand (n.d.). Musica. GS I, pp. 103–122.
- Johannes de Garlandia (13th century). De musica mensurabili positio, text on CHTML at Indiana University.
- Kamien, Roger (2008). Music: An appreciation (sixth brief / student ed.). Boston, MA: McGraw-Hill Higher Education. ISBN 978-0-07-340134-8.
- Kliewer, Vernon L. (1975). "Melody: Linear aspects of twentieth-century music". In Wittlich, Gary E. (ed.). Aspects of Twentieth-Century Music. Englewood Cliffs, NJ: Prentice-Hall. pp. 270–321. ISBN 0-13-049346-5.
- Lahdelma, Imre, and Tuomas Eerola (26 May 2020). "Cultural Familiarity and Musical Expertise Impact the Pleasantness of Consonance / Dissonance but Not Its Perceived Tension." Scientific Reports 10, no. 8693
- Landon, H.C. Robbins (1955). The Symphonies of Joseph Haydn. London, UK: Universal Edition and Rockliff.
- Levelt, Willem, and Reiner Plomp (1964). "The Appreciation of Musical Intervals". In Actes du cinquième Congrès international d'esthétique/Proceedings of the Fifth International Congress of Aesthetics, edited by Jan Aler, 901–904. The Hague: Mouton.
- Machaut, Guillaume de (1926). "Balladen, rondeaux und virelais". In Ludwig, Friedrich (ed.). Musikalische Werke [Musical Works] (in German). Vol. I. Leipzig, DE: Breitkopf.
- Milne, Andrew; Sethares, William A.; Plamondon, James (Winter 2007). "Invariant fingerings across a tuning continuum". Computer Music Journal. 31 (4): 15–32. doi:10.1162/comj.2007.31.4.15.
- Milne, Andrew; Sethares, William A.; Plamondon, James (Spring 2008). "Tuning continua and keyboard layouts" (PDF). Journal of Mathematics and Music. 2: 1–19. doi:10.1080/17459730701828677.
- Myers, Charles S. (25 June 1904). "Theories of Consonance and Dissonance". The British Journal of Psychology. 1: 315–316 – via Google books.
- Pankovski, Toso, and Eva Pankovska (October 2017). "Emergence of the consonance pattern within synaptic weights of a neural network featuring Hebbian neuroplasticity". Biologically Assisted Cognitive Architectures 22 : 82–94.
- Pankovski, Toso, and Ana Pankovska (May 2022). "Nonspecific hebbian neural network model predicts musical scales discreteness and just intonation without using octave-equivalency mapping". Nature - Scientific Reports 12, 8795.
- Parncutt, Richard, and Graham Hair (2011). "Consonance and Dissonance in Music Theory and Psychology: Disentangling dissonant dichotomies". Journal of Interdisciplinary Music Studies 5, no. 2 (Fall): 119–66.
- Patterson, Roy D. (1986). "Spiral detection of periodicity and the spiral form of musical scales". Psychology of Music. 14 (1): 44–61. doi:10.1177/0305735686141004.
- Philip, James A. (1966). Pythagoras and Early Pythagoreanism. Toronto: University of Toronto Press.
- Radcliffe, Philip (1978). Mozart Piano Concertos. London, UK: British Broadcasting Corporation.
- Renard Vallet, Emilio (2016). "Sonancia: una clarificación conceptual [Sonance: A conceptual clarification]". Quodlibet, 61: 58–64.
- Roederer, Juan G. (1973). Introduction to the Physics and Psychophysics of Music. Heidelberg Science Library. Vol. 16. London, UK: English University Press.
- Roederer, Juan G. (1995). The Physics and Psychophysics of Music: An introduction (3rd ed.). New York: Springer-Verlag. ISBN 0-387-94366-8.
- Russell, George (2008). George Russell's Lydian Chromatic Concept of Tonal Organization. Vol. 1 (4th ed.). Brookline, MA: Concept Publishing. ISBN 9780846426004.
- Schoenberg, Arnold (1975) [1926]. "Opinion or insight?". In Stein, Leonard (ed.). Style and Idea: Selected writings of Arnold Schoenberg. Translated by Black, Leo. New York, NY / London, UK: St. Martins Press / Faber & Faber. pp. 258–264. ISBN 0-520-05294-3.
- Schoenberg, Arnold (1978). Theory of Harmony. Translated by Carter, Roy E. Berkeley, CA / Los Angeles, CA: University of California Press. ISBN 978-0-520-04945-1.
- Schuijer, Michiel (2008). Analyzing Atonal Music: Pitch-class set theory and its contexts. Eastman Studies in Music. Vol. 60. Rochester, NY: University of Rochester Press. ISBN 978-1-58046-270-9.
- Schulter, Margo (1997a). "Thirteenth-century polyphony". Medieval Music & Arts Foundation. Todd M. McComb.
- Schulter, Margo (1997b). "Pythagorean tuning". Medieval Music & Arts Foundation. Todd M. McComb.
- Schulter, Margo (1997c). "Multi-voice combinations". Medieval Music & Arts Foundation. Todd M. McComb.
- Schulter, Margo (1997d). "Pythagorean tuning and Gothic polyphony". Medieval Music & Arts Foundation. Todd M. McComb.
- Scruton, Roger (2009). Understanding Music. London, UK: Continuum.
- Scruton, Roger (2016). The Ring of Truth: The wisdom of Wagner's Ring of the Nibelung. Allen Lane: Penguin Books.
- Schweitzer, A (1905). J.S. Bach. London, UK: Black.
- Sethares, W.A. (September 1992). "Relating tuning and timbre". Experimental Musical Instruments. Archived from the original on 10 June 2010.
- Sethares, W.A. (2005). Tuning, Timbre, Spectrum, Scale (2nd ed.). London, UK: Springer. ISBN 1-85233-797-4.
- Sethares, W.A.; Milne, Andrew; Tiedje, Stefan; Prechtl, Anthony & Plamondon, James (Summer 2009). "Spectral tools for dynamic tonality and audio morphing". Computer Music Journal. 33 (2): 71–84. doi:10.1162/comj.2009.33.2.71.
- Stein, Erwin. 1953. Orpheus in New Guises. London: Rockliff. Reprinted Westport, Conn.: Hyperion Press, 1979. ISBN 978-0-88355-765-5.
- Stumpf, Carl (1890). Tonpsychologie, vol. II. Leipzig: S. Hirzel. Reprinted Hilversum: F. Knuf, 1965.
- Taruskin, Richard (2005). The Oxford History of Western Music. Vol. 4: Music in the Early Twentieth Century. Oxford, UK and New York, NY: Oxford University Press.
- Tenney, James (1988). A History of "Consonance" and "Dissonance". New York: Excelsior Music Publishing Company.
- Terhardt, Ernst (1974). "On the Perception of Periodic Sound Fluctuations (Roughness)". Acustica. 30 (4): 201–13.
- Tymoczko, Dimitri (2011). A Geometry of Music: Harmony and Counterpoint in the Extended Common Practice. Oxford and New York: Oxford University Press. ISBN 978-0-19-533667-2.
- Vassilakis, Panteleimon Nestor (2001). Perceptual and Physical Properties of Amplitude Fluctuation and their Musical Significance. Doctoral dissertation. University of California, Los Angeles.
- Vassilakis, Panteleimon Nestor (2005). "Auditory Roughness as Means of Musical Expression". Selected Reports in Ethnomusicology, 12: 119–144.
- Vassilakis, Panteleimon Nestor, and K. Fitz (2007). SRA: A web-based research tool for spectral and roughness analysis of sound signals. Supported by a Northwest Academic Computing Consortium grant to J. Middleton, Eastern Washington University.
- Whittaker, W.G. (1959). The Cantatas of Johann Sebastian Bach. London and New York: Oxford University Press.
- Zwicker, Eberhard (May 1961). "Subdivision of the Audible Frequency into Critical Bands". Journal of the Acoustical Society of America. 33 (2): 248–249. Bibcode:1961ASAJ...33..248Z. doi:10.1121/1.1908630.
- Zwicker, Eberhard; Flottorp, G.; Stevens, S. S. (1957). "Critical band-width in loudness summation". Journal of the Acoustical Society of America. 29 (5): 548–557. Bibcode:1957ASAJ...29..548Z. doi:10.1121/1.1908963.
