= Bark scale =

Auditory frequency metric

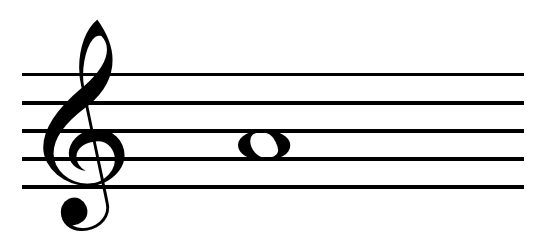
A440. 440 Hz = 4.21 or 4.39

The Bark scale is a psychoacoustical scale proposed by Eberhard Zwicker in 1961. It is named after Heinrich Barkhausen, who proposed the first subjective measurements of loudness. One definition of the term is "a frequency scale on which equal distances correspond with perceptually equal distances. Above about 500 Hz this scale is more or less equal to a logarithmic frequency axis. Below 500 Hz the Bark scale becomes more and more linear."

The scale ranges from 1 to 24 and corresponds to the first 24 critical bands of hearing.

It is related to, but somewhat less popular than, the mel scale, a perceptual scale of pitches judged by listeners to be equal in distance from one another.

== Bark scale critical bands ==
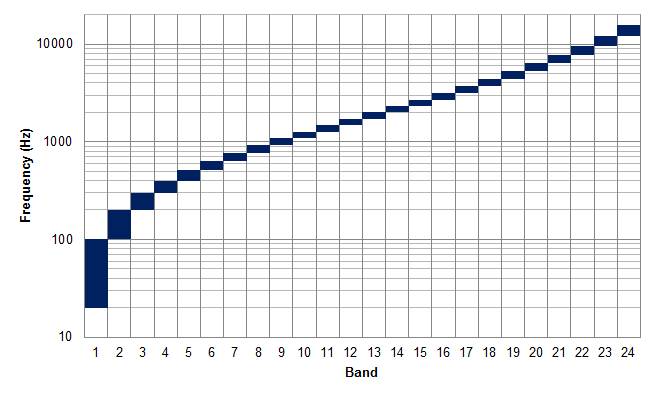
Chart of the critical bands of the Bark scale

Number	Center frequency (Hz)	Cut-off frequency (Hz)	Bandwidth (Hz)
		20	
1	50	100	80
2	150	200	100
3	250	300	100
4	350	400	100
5	450	510	110
6	570	630	120
7	700	770	140
8	840	920	150
9	1000	1080	160
10	1170	1270	190
11	1370	1480	210
12	1600	1720	240
13	1850	2000	280
14	2150	2320	320
15	2500	2700	380
16	2900	3150	450
17	3400	3700	550
18	4000	4400	700
19	4800	5300	900
20	5800	6400	1100
21	7000	7700	1300
22	8500	9500	1800
23	10500	12000	2500
24	13500	15500	3500

Since the direct measurements of the critical bands are subject to error, the values in this table have been generously rounded.

In his letter "Subdivision of the Audible Frequency Range into Critical Bands", Zwicker states:

"These bands have been directly measured in experiments on the threshold for complex sounds, on masking, on the perception of phase, and most often on the loudness of complex sounds. In all these phenomena, the critical band seems to play an important role. It must be pointed out that the measurements taken so far indicate that the critical bands have a certain width, but that their position on the frequency scale is not fixed; rather, the position can be changed continuously, perhaps by the ear itself."

Thus the important attribute of the Bark scale is the width of the critical band at any given frequency, not the exact values of the edges or centers of any band.

== Conversions ==
To convert a frequency f (Hz) into Bark use:

$$\text{Bark} = 13 \arctan(0.00076f) + 3.5 \arctan((f/7500)^2) \,$$

or (Traunmüller, 1990)

$$\text{Bark} = [(26.81 f) / (1960 + f )] - 0.53 \,$$

or (Wang, Sekey & Gersho, 1992)

$$\text{Bark} = 6 \sinh^{-1}(f / 600)$$

== See also ==
- Luminosity function, which describes the average sensitivity of the human eye to light of different wavelengths.
- Fletcher–Munson curves
- Equivalent rectangular bandwidth, the ERB scale
- Critical bands
