= Mel scale =

Conceptual scale

Plots of pitch mel scale versus hertz scale

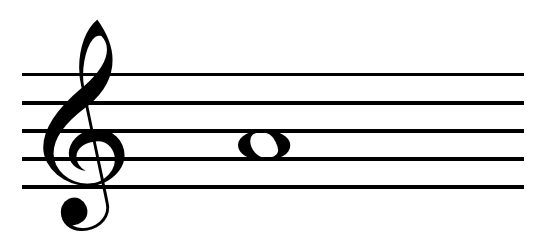
A440. 440 Hz = 549.64 mels

The mel scale (after the word melody) is a perceptual scale of pitches judged by listeners to be equal in distance from one another. The reference point between this scale and normal frequency measurement is defined by assigning a perceptual pitch of 1000 mels to a 1000 Hz tone, 40 dB above the listener's threshold. Above about 500 Hz, increasingly large intervals are judged by listeners to produce equal pitch increments.

== Formula ==
A formula (O'Shaughnessy 1987) to convert f hertz into m mels is
$$m = 2595 \log_{10}\left(1 + \frac{f}{700}\right).$$

Mel-scale from 200 to 1500, in intervals of 50

== History and other formulas ==
The formula from O'Shaughnessy's book can be expressed with different logarithmic bases:
$$m = 2595 \log_{10}\left(1 + \frac{f}{700}\right) = 1127 \ln\left(1 + \frac{f}{700}\right).$$

The corresponding inverse expressions are
$$f = 700\left(10^\frac{m}{2595} - 1\right) = 700\left(e^\frac{m}{1127} - 1\right).$$

There were published curves and tables on psychophysical pitch scales since Steinberg's 1937 curves based on just-noticeable differences of pitch. More curves soon followed in Fletcher and Munson's 1937 and Fletcher's 1938 and Stevens' 1937 and Stevens and Volkmann's 1940 papers using a variety of experimental methods and analysis approaches.

In 1949 Koenig published an approximation based on separate linear and logarithmic segments, with a break at 1000 Hz.

Gunnar Fant proposed the current popular linear/logarithmic formula in 1949, but with the 1000 Hz corner frequency.

An alternate expression of the formula, not depending on choice of logarithm base, is noted in Fant (1968):
$$m = \frac{1000}{\log 2} \log\left(1 + \frac{f}{1000}\right).$$

In 1976, Makhoul and Cosell published the now-popular version with the 700 Hz corner frequency. As Ganchev et al. have observed, "The formulae [with 700], when compared to [Fant's with 1000], provide a closer approximation of the Mel scale for frequencies below 1000 Hz, at the price of higher inaccuracy for frequencies higher than 1000 Hz." Above 7 kHz, however, the situation is reversed, and the 700 Hz version again fits better.

Data by which some of these formulas are motivated are tabulated in Beranek (1949), as measured from the curves of Stevens and Volkmann:

Beranek 1949 mel scale data from Stevens and Volkmann 1940
Hz	20	160	394	670	1000	1420	1900	2450	3120	4000	5100	6600	9000	14000
mel	0	250	500	750	1000	1250	1500	1750	2000	2250	2500	2750	3000	3250

A formula with a break frequency of 625 Hz is given by Lindsay & Norman (1977); the formula does not appear in their 1972 first edition:
$$m = 2410 \log_{10}(0.0016 f + 1).$$

For direct comparison with other formulae, this is equivalent to
$$m = 2410 \log_{10}\left(1 + \frac{f}{625}\right).$$

Most mel-scale formulas give exactly 1000 mels at 1000 Hz. The break frequency (e.g. 700 Hz, 1000 Hz, or 625 Hz) is the only free parameter in the usual form of the formula. Some non-mel auditory-frequency-scale formulas use the same form but with much lower break frequency, not necessarily mapping to 1000 at 1000 Hz; for example the ERB-rate scale of Glasberg and Moore (1990) uses a break point of 228.8 Hz, and the cochlear frequency–place map of Greenwood (1990) uses 165.3 Hz.

Other functional forms for the mel scale have been explored by Umesh et al.; they point out that the traditional formulas with a logarithmic region and a linear region do not fit the data from Stevens and Volkmann's curves as well as some other forms, based on the following data table of measurements that they made from those curves:

Umesh et al. 1999 mel scale data from Stevens and Volkmann 1940
Hz	40	161	200	404	693	867	1000	2022	3000	3393	4109	5526	6500	7743	12000
mel	43	257	300	514	771	928	1000	1542	2000	2142	2314	2600	2771	2914	3228

Slaney's MATLAB Auditory Toolbox agrees with Umesh et al. and uses the following two-piece fit, though notably not using the "1000 mels at 1000 Hz" convention:
$$m(f) = \begin{cases}
\dfrac{3f}{200}, & f < 1000, \\
15 + 27 \log_{6.4} \left(\dfrac{f}{1000}\right), & f \geq 1000.
\end{cases}$$

== Applications ==
The first version of Google's Lyra codec uses log mel spectrograms as the feature-extraction step. The transmitted data is a vector-quantized form of the spectrogram, which is then synthesized back to speech by a neural network. Use of the mel scale is believed to weigh the data in a way appropriate to human perception. MelGAN takes a similar approach.

== Criticism ==
Stevens' student Donald D. Greenwood, who had worked on the mel scale experiments in 1956, considers the scale biased by experimental flaws. In 2009 he posted to a mailing list:

I would ask, why use the Mel scale now, since it appears to be biased? If anyone wants a Mel scale, they should do it over, controlling carefully for order bias and using plenty of subjects – more than in the past – and using both musicians and non-musicians to search for any differences in performance that may be governed by musician/non-musician differences or subject differences generally.

== See also ==
- Bark scale
- Mel-frequency cepstrum
- Fletcher–Munson curves
