= Equivalent rectangular bandwidth =

Measure used in psychoacoustics

The equivalent rectangular bandwidth or ERB is a measure used in psychoacoustics, which gives an approximation to the bandwidths of the filters in human hearing, using the unrealistic but convenient simplification of modeling the filters as rectangular band-pass filters, or band-stop filters, like in tailor-made notched music training (TMNMT).

== Approximations ==
For moderate sound levels and young listeners, Moore & Glasberg (1983) suggest that the bandwidth of human auditory filters can be approximated by the polynomial equation:

$\operatorname\mathsf{ERB}(\ F\ ) = 6.23 \cdot F^2 + 93.39 \cdot F + 28.52$	Eq.1

where F is the center frequency of the filter, in kHz, and ERB( F ) is the bandwidth of the filter in Hz. The approximation is based on the results of a number of published simultaneous masking experiments and is valid from 100–6500Hz.

Seven years later, Glasberg & Moore (1990) published another, simpler approximation:

$\, \operatorname\mathsf{ERB}(\ f\ ) = 24.7\ \cdot \left( 4.37 \cdot f + 1 \right)\,$	Eq.2

where f is in kHz and ERB(f) is also in kHz. The approximation is applicable at moderate sound levels and for values of f between 100 and 10000Hz.

== ERB-rate scale ==
The ERB-rate scale, or ERB-number scale, can be defined as a function ERBS(f) which returns the number of equivalent rectangular bandwidths below the given frequency f. The units of the ERB-number scale are known ERBs, or as Cams, following a suggestion by Hartmann. The scale can be constructed by solving the following differential system of equations:

$$\begin{cases}
\mathrm{ERBS}(0) = 0\\
\frac{df}{d\mathrm{ERBS}(f)} = \mathrm{ERB}(f)\\
\end{cases}$$

The solution for ERBS(f) is the integral of the reciprocal of ERB(f) with the constant of integration set in such a way that ERBS(0) = 0.

Using the second order polynomial approximation (Eq.1) for ERB(f) yields:

$\mathrm{ERBS}(f) = 11.17 \cdot \ln\left(\frac{f+0.312}{f+14.675}\right) + 43.0$

where f is in kHz. The VOICEBOX speech processing toolbox for MATLAB implements the conversion and its inverse as:

$\mathrm{ERBS}(f) = 11.17268 \cdot \ln\left(47.065 - \frac{676170.42 \cdot f}{f + 14678.49}\right)$
$f = \frac{676170.4}{47.06538 - e^{0.08950404 \cdot \mathrm{ERBS}(f)}} - 14678.49$

where f is in Hz.

Using the linear approximation (Eq.2) for ERB(f) yields:

$\mathrm{ERBS}(f) = 21.4 \cdot \log_{10}(1 + 4.37 \cdot f)$

where f is in kHz.

== See also ==
- Critical bands
- Bark scale
