= Awareness =

State of knowing or noticing something

Awareness is a state of knowing, understanding, or being conscious of something. Its precise definition is disputed and varies across disciplines. Some accounts treat it as a synonym for consciousness, while others characterize it as cognitive access to information that can occur without subjective experience. Awareness plays a central role in everyday life by helping individuals perceive their surroundings, monitor and regulate their behavior, and make information available to other cognitive processes.

Awareness can take different objects or forms. External awareness concerns objects in the environment, primarily perceived through the five senses. It contrasts with inner awareness, which encompasses bodily sensations, such as pain, and mental states, such as thoughts. Self-awareness involves recognizing oneself as the object of awareness, whereas meta-awareness is awareness of awareness. Focal awareness encompasses contents at the center of attention, in contrast to peripheral awareness. Theorists also examine awareness in nonhuman animals and the possibility of artificial awareness.

To measure awareness, researchers typically use indirect evidence because awareness cannot be directly observed from a third-person perspective. Subjective measures analyze reports from individuals describing their awareness of a stimulus. Objective measures infer awareness from observable behavior, such as task performance, or physiological signals, such as brain activity.

Awareness is relevant to many disciplines. Philosophy seeks to determine its essential features, how it arises, what functions it plays, and what it subjectively feels like. It considers theories about the relation between awareness and matter, how conscious mental states differ from unconscious ones, and how awareness acts as a source of knowledge. Psychology examines the conditions under which people become aware of information, how this information influences their behavior, and how mental disorders impair or distort awareness. Clinical medicine is interested in how anesthetics reduce or prevent awareness during painful medical treatments. Neuroscience studies the relation between the brain and awareness, for example, by searching for brain regions and events that accompany awareness. Several religious traditions regard specific forms of awareness as spiritually significant, such as the Buddhist focus on mindfulness as nonjudgmental awareness associated with equanimity. Other relevant fields include biology, computer science, linguistics, sociology, and marketing research.

== Definition ==
Awareness is a broad term for subjective experience, cognitive access to information, or the ability to notice and understand internal and external events. Its precise definition is disputed and varies by context and discipline.

Awareness is typically characterized as awareness of something: (Note: Some spiritual traditions consider the possibility of an objectless or pure awareness as a non-ordinary state of consciousness.) it is about or directed at certain contents. For example, when a person consciously perceives a tree or hears a voice then the tree or voice becomes a content of their awareness. Awareness is not limited to perceptual objects in the environment but also includes internal states, such as bodily sensations of warmth, emotions, desires, intentions, judgments, and thoughts about abstract ideas. The expression aware that is often used in a factive meaning, according to which one can be aware only of things that are real. In a broader sense, awareness also encompasses contents that do not accurately represent reality or are not believed to be true, such as imagined scenarios, dreams, and hallucinations.

Which contents enter awareness is influenced by various factors, including the external situation; the strength and novelty of stimuli; and the individual's attention, goals, expectations, and memories. The different contents are typically not presented as isolated phenomena but are embedded in a broader context of meaningful patterns, including information about their emotional significance to the individual and practical implications for behavior and decision-making. In this regard, awareness often involves an active interpretation that organizes and evaluates information rather than an impartial, passive representation.

Some characterizations understand awareness as an all-or-nothing phenomenon: it is either fully present or fully absent. Another outlook regards awareness as a gradual state that can arise in different degrees. This view reflects the idea that one can be aware of more or less contents at the same time and that those contents can have varying degrees of clarity, vagueness, and uncertainty. Awareness contrasts with unawareness, which is a lack of subjective experience or knowledge. Unawareness can apply to specific contents of experience, like when a person is unaware of a background noise, or to a complete absence of awareness, which may be the case during dreamless sleep or coma. Certain forms of cognition occur without awareness, such as low-level neural processes underlying face recognition and language processing.

Awareness plays a central role in everyday life by helping individuals perceive and respond to their surroundings, making information available to cognitive processes such as reasoning and reflection, and allowing individuals to monitor and regulate their behavior by modifying automatic responses or engaging in deliberate actions. It is studied in several fields, including philosophy, psychology, and neuroscience. Research is not limited to human awareness but also addresses the awareness of nonhuman animals.

The term awareness originated from the Old English word gewær, which has Germanic roots. The Old English term entered Middle English as the word iwar, which developed into the modern English adjective aware. The noun awareness was formed by adding the suffix -ness, with the earliest known use in the 1830s in the work of the physician and writer David Macbeth Moir.

=== Relation to consciousness ===
Awareness is closely related to phenomenal consciousness and the terms are often used as near synonyms. Understood in this sense, awareness is characterized as subjective experience that involves a first-person perspective on oneself and the environment. It is not merely the availability of information but also includes a phenomenal dimension or experiential character of what it feels like to encounter the contents of awareness.

However, the terms awareness and consciousness are not always treated as synonyms, and some theorists explicitly distinguish between them. According to one view, awareness is access to mental contents that makes information available (Note: This meaning is sometimes termed access consciousness.) or a set of cognitive and behavioral capacities through which individuals acquire, process, and use information. These capacities can include the abilities to respond to environmental stimuli; to discriminate between objects; to store, retrieve, and interpret information; to formulate plans of action; and to report one's mental states. According to one interpretation, this function-based characterization implies that any biological or artificial system with the relevant capacities can be described as aware, regardless of whether it has phenomenal consciousness. In this sense, it is possible to distinguish between conscious awareness, which is accompanied by subjective experience, and unconscious awareness, which involves cognitive processes without phenomenal consciousness. For example, the medical condition of blindsight, in which people with brain damage lose visual consciousness but can still respond to certain forms of visual information, is sometimes suggested as an example of unconscious awareness. (Note: Other approaches hold that consciousness includes the ability to have subjective feelings and react in addition to awareness; that consciousness includes alertness as a second component; or that awareness is like a light that can illuminate conscious, preconscious, and unconscious processes.)

=== Other related concepts ===
Awareness is closely related to attention, a process or ability that selects certain contents and positions them at the center of awareness. Attention prioritizes certain objects or features while filtering out irrelevant contents, thereby focusing cognitive resources on aspects considered relevant. Awareness is not limited to the focus of attention and includes peripheral contents that are noticed but remain in the background. For example, a person may focus attention on a laptop while remaining peripherally aware of an ashtray in the corner of their desk.

Wakefulness, another connected concept, is a condition of being alert and responsive to one's environment rather than being asleep, anaesthetized, or in a coma. Awareness is typically associated with wakefulness but may also occur without it, as when a person is dreaming and aware of the dream scenario. It may also be possible to be awake without being aware; for example, a person in a vegetative state with severe brain damage may still undergo sleep–wake cycles while lacking signs of awareness.

The concept of awareness further overlaps with those of perception, knowledge, and sentience. Perception organizes and interprets sensory information about the world, including visual and auditory impressions. It is a central form of awareness but not the only one, since people can also be aware of internal states, such as emotions and thoughts. Knowledge is often characterized as a cognitive achievement, such as a true belief based on good reasons. Awareness overlaps with knowledge in this sense and can be a source of knowledge. However, awareness can also present inaccurate contents, such as hallucinations. Sentience is usually defined as the capacity to experience positive or negative feelings, such as pleasure and pain. (Note: Some broader definitions characterize sentience as the general ability to sense and respond to one's environment, regardless of whether sensations are accompanied by feelings.) Awareness can involve sentience in this sense but may also include contents other than feelings.

== Forms ==
=== External and internal ===
Many forms of awareness are discussed in the academic literature, often distinguished by the types of content they present. External awareness, or exteroception, is awareness of one's environment. It is primarily tied to the five senses, which are different modes of perceiving things outside oneself: seeing, hearing, touching, tasting, and smelling. Impressions from these sensory modes are typically integrated into a unified awareness of the objects and events around oneself and their relative spatial locations. External awareness helps individuals gather information about the world, respond to changes in their surroundings, and navigate their environment. Direct and indirect realists debate whether the contents of external awareness are material objects themselves or representations mediating between perceiver and objects, such as sense data.

Inner awareness encompasses one's own body and mental states. (Note: Defined more narrowly, inner awareness is limited to mental states.) Like external awareness, bodily awareness is multimodal, involving diverse senses and elements. They include proprioception associated with the position and movement of one's limbs and other body parts; the vestibular sense covering balance, orientation, and self-location; interoception concerning internal physiological states such as hunger, thirst, breathing, heartbeat, and temperature; pain; tactile sensations; and a sense of bodily ownership and ability to act. Bodily awareness allows individuals to monitor their internal states, regulate physiological needs, and coordinate their movements. An influential classification (Note: This approach was initially proposed by David Malet Armstrong.) divides these elements into two categories: bodily sensations, which affect specific regions of the body, such as pain in a foot and an itch behind an ear; and bodily feelings, which are experienced as diffuse states not confined to particular body parts, such as thirst and fatigue. Another taxonomy contrasts high-level body awareness, which involves conceptual or emotional representations of the body, with low-level body awareness, which involves more immediate sensorimotor information often directly relevant to action.

Müller-Lyer illusion is an example of misleading information in external awareness: the upper horizontal line appears longer than the lower horizontal line because of the attached arrowheads, but both lines have objectively the same length.

Another type of inner awareness concerns knowledge of one's own mental states, including thoughts, memories, beliefs, emotions, desires, intentions, and mental images. Introspection is the process of examining one's mental states, as when a person recognizes that they are imagining a specific scenario, entertaining a particular thought, or feeling anxious about the outcome of an event. Understood in a broad sense, introspection covers all forms of inner awareness of the mind. Understood more narrowly, it is an explicit or reflective form of inner awareness in which a person deliberately attends to psychological events, in contrast to pre-reflective forms of inner awareness, which occur without introspection.

Both external and inner awareness are sources of knowledge. Academic debates assess and compare their reliability. External awareness can present false information in the form of illusions, as in the Müller-Lyer illusion, in which one line appears longer than another although both have the same length. A traditionally influential view holds that many forms of inner awareness are immune to error, for instance, that it is impossible to be aware of pain without being in pain. This view has been challenged in the contemporary discourse. One suggested counterexample is that a person may mistake a sensation of coldness for pain, leading them to believe that they are in pain when they are not. A more limited proposal restricts the immunity to a specific type of error: error through misidentification. This view holds that a person cannot be wrong about whether they, rather than someone else, are undergoing the experience. Such errors are possible in external awareness. For example, when a person in an accident sees a broken arm, they may falsely assume that it is their own arm.

=== Self ===
Understood in one sense, self-awareness is the same as inner awareness, covering all awareness of one's bodily and mental states. In another sense, it involves recognizing oneself as the object of awareness. This implies that one is aware of oneself as oneself, meaning that the content is not only something that belongs to the self but is at the same time recognized as such. For example, looking at an old photograph of oneself is self-awareness if one recognizes oneself but not if one mistakes the depicted person for a stranger. In this sense, self-awareness is not limited to private aspects, such as personal feelings, but also encompasses awareness of public features, such as one's physical appearance and mannerisms. Self-awareness can include a temporal dimension, in which a person sees themselves as an entity that persists through time; a social dimension, involving awareness of how one is viewed by others; a narrative dimension, concerning awareness of oneself as an enduring character in stories constructed by oneself and others; and an evaluative dimension, in which a person assesses themselves and their behavior against standards and ideals.

Some philosophers hold that all conscious awareness involves pre-reflective self-awareness: an implicit consciousness of oneself as the subject of experience without the self becoming an explicit content of that experience. Pre-reflective self-awareness in this sense contrasts with reflective introspection in which the self becomes an object of attention. It is controversial whether some form of self-awareness is present in every experience. Suggested counterexamples of selfless experiences include states of drug-induced ego dissolution through psychoactive substances, flow experiences involving undivided attention to a task, and being fully absorbed in a captivating movie.

Another debate concerns the definition and nature of the self, for instance, whether it is an object distinct from the environment, a specific mental faculty, a conscious observer of changing experiences, or a shifting collection of mental processes without a permanent essence. Views about the self can influence how self-awareness is understood. For example, David Hume challenged the existence of certain forms of self-awareness, arguing that there is no distinctive experience of a self. He held that instead of a persistent self, there is only a successive bundle of experiences forming a stream of consciousness.

=== Meta ===
Meta-awareness is awareness of awareness.

Meta-awareness is awareness of awareness. It is a form of metacognition that involves explicit knowledge of what one is thinking, feeling, or perceiving. During episodes of meta-awareness, experience turns back on itself and takes note of its contents. For example, a student may recognize that instead of reviewing their lecture notes as intended, they have spent the past few minutes imagining weekend plans. The episode of mind-wandering was a form of awareness without explicit self-monitoring since the student had no meta-awareness that their attention had drifted. Some forms of mind-wandering may include meta-awareness, which is reflected in the contrast between tuning out and zoning out: a person may intentionally decide to tune out from an ongoing task while remaining meta-aware, whereas unintentional episodes of zoning out are forms of mind-wandering without meta-awareness.

A key function of meta-awareness is to monitor and regulate ongoing mental processes. It can help individuals detect and address problems in other cognitive activities. For instance, meta-awareness can help the student whose mind has wandered to refocus attention on reviewing lecture notes. Meta-awareness is also relevant to certain meditative practices that cultivate the ability to engage in nonjudgmental observation of mental events, such as mindfulness.

=== Nonhuman ===
The study of awareness is not limited to humans and also addresses animal awareness. Animals typically detect and respond to features of their environment, suggesting a basic form of awareness of their surroundings. A key question is whether these forms of animal intelligence involve or indicate conscious awareness. Common sense often assumes that at least some species, such as dogs and cats, are conscious. However, scientifically determining whether a particular species is conscious is difficult because consciousness cannot be directly observed. Instead, research has to use indirect behavioral and physiological evidence, such as flexible and goal-directed behavior, learning from experience, responses to pain and injury, the expression of emotions, and brain complexity. Researchers often rely on comparisons to humans, such as similarities between how humans and animals behave, express feelings, show patterns of neural activity, and have evolved.

Two research questions are whether animals of a particular species have conscious awareness at all, and if so, what their experiences are like. (Note: For example, an influential thought experiment by Thomas Nagel asks What Is It Like to Be a Bat?, exploring the idea that different senses, such as the echolocation of bats, could result in subjective experiences that humans cannot imagine.) Traditional research has sometimes assumed that humans are exceptional and have a higher or more elaborate form of consciousness. Contemporary discussions have questioned this assumption and tend to focus more on how consciousness may vary across species along different dimensions. This approach may construct experiential profiles for distinct species without attempting to combine the different dimensions into a single scale of consciousness. Some researchers also consider the possibility of conscious awareness in plants. (Note: In a different sense, the term plant awareness describes the awareness that humans have of plants, including how they perceive, understand, and value plants.)

The question of animal awareness plays a key role in animal ethics, particularly in discussions of the moral status and appropriate treatment of animals. For example, the existence of animal consciousness is relevant to debates about the negative effects of factory farming on animal well-being.

Another research topic concerns the problem of artificial awareness as a potential capacity of artificial intelligence. Computers can simulate certain functions of human awareness—such as perception, reasoning, language use, and learning—and perform computations that replicate some cognitive processes underlying these phenomena. However, it is controversial whether such simulations can produce conscious awareness. The school of functionalism holds that mental phenomena are defined by the functions they perform. This view leaves open the possibility of consciousness in computational systems that perform the functions associated with subjective experience. Research on artificial consciousness faces methodological problems similar to those in the study of animal consciousness, such as the difficulty of relying on indirect evidence to judge whether subjective consciousness is present. Another line of research focuses on information processing rather than subjective consciousness. It studies computational awareness as the capacity to detect and analyze information relevant to a situation and use it in automated decision-making.

=== Others ===
Focal awareness encompasses contents at the center of attention, such as a text one is reading, while peripheral awareness encompasses objects outside the focus, such as the surrounding room noticed in the background while reading.

The contrast between focal and peripheral awareness concerns the structure of awareness. Focal awareness encompasses contents at the center of attention that are processed and experienced in greater detail. These contents typically relate to a task the individual is engaged in or are considered important in another way. Peripheral awareness involves contents outside the center of attention. The individual remains sensitive to those contents and may respond to unexpected changes, but processes them in less detail and dedicates more cognitive resources to the contents of focal awareness. For example, when a person's focal awareness is directed toward a text they are reading, they usually remain peripherally aware of their surroundings and certain objects in their vicinity. Similarly, when a person's auditory attention is captured by a guitar solo, they are typically still peripherally aware of other instruments that accompany the guitar. (Note: A related approach analyzes the structure of awareness into theme, thematic field, and margin: the theme is the center of attention, the thematic fields includes contents relevant to the theme, and the margin includes contents not relevant to the theme. The awareness of an object may further include an internal horizon, which concerns parts and aspects of the object, and an external horizon, which concerns the object's relation to a wider context.)

Some theorists use the term awareness in a narrow sense to refer only to conscious awareness, which involves subjective experience. Understood in a broader sense, the term also encompasses unconscious or nonconscious awareness, in which individuals are aware of information without subjectively experiencing it. This can take the form of automatic cognitive processes that monitor external and internal events and use this information to influence behavior without conscious experience of those events. For instance, subliminal perceptions involve sensory stimuli that do not reach conscious awareness because they are too brief or not intense enough. These stimuli are nonetheless processed by the brain and can influence subsequent behavior. Another example concerns people with blindsight who report no visual experience of an object in front of them but can nonetheless accurately guess its location or features. Covert awareness is a phenomenon found in some patients in a vegetative state who appear unconscious to observers. They are externally unresponsive, but scans of their brain activity indicate that they can still follow commands, such as instructions to imagine playing tennis or moving from one room to another in their home. Altered states of awareness are forms of consciousness that differ qualitatively from the normal waking state. They include dreams, delirium, drug-induced hallucinations, and spiritual experiences.

Another distinction is between direct and propositional awareness. Direct awareness concerns a particular entity that is directly presented as an object of awareness. Propositional awareness concerns not a particular entity but a proposition or state of affairs, which can involve the properties of or relations between entities. For example, if one hears the doorbell and infers that a guest has arrived then this is propositional awareness of the guest's arrival. When the host opens the door and sees the guest, they have direct awareness of the guest. A key difference is that propositional awareness depends on how one thinks about and conceptualizes the entities involved, whereas direct awareness does not.

Several forms of awareness are involved in agency as individuals formulate action plans, anticipate outcomes, make decisions, and carry out their intentions. For example, awareness of what one is doing is often treated as an essential component of intentional action. This awareness is closely related to the sense of agency in which a person experiences themselves as the one who causes and controls the action. This distinguishes intentional actions from involuntary movements not guided by a conscious plan, such as the contrast between intentionally lifting one's right arm and the arm being raised externally by someone else. Conscious awareness is typically limited to certain aspects of an action, such as the movement one intends to perform, while diverse background processes coordinating the muscle activity and sensory feedback remain unconscious. Awareness of the reasons and values that motivate an action may influence the extent to which a person is morally responsible for performing this action.

Mindfulness is a form of awareness that plays a central role in various spiritual traditions, particularly in Buddhism. It is a nonjudgmental awareness focused on the bodily sensations, emotions, and thoughts one is currently having. It responds to mind-wandering by refocusing attention back to the present. Mindfulness involves observation of the contents of awareness without immediately trying to control or change them. The goal of practicing mindfulness is often to cultivate a form of equanimity while reducing the mind's tendency to get distracted and ruminate.

Various topic-specific forms of awareness are examined in the academic literature. Social awareness is knowledge of social situations, either about what other people are doing or more generally about social roles, positions, responsibilities, and group processes. It is closely related to group awareness, which encompasses knowledge of social information about a group and its members. Cultural awareness is a sensitivity to how culture shapes behavior in oneself and others. It includes knowledge of the beliefs, perceptions, and values common in different cultures, including one's own. Situational awareness is an understanding of one's environment and the elements within it. Other topic-specific types include security awareness, legal awareness, and suicide awareness.

== Measurement ==
Researchers use several methods to study awareness. A key obstacle to measurement is that awareness cannot be directly observed from a third-person perspective, forcing researchers to rely on indirect evidence. The different methods can be divided into subjective and objective approaches. Subjective measures ask individuals to use introspection to report and describe the contents of their awareness. For example, an individual may be presented with a stimulus (Note: Researchers employ several ways of presenting stimuli to study the threshold between awareness and unawareness, such as visual masking, visual crowding, and attentional blink.) and then asked whether they were aware of it and what features they experienced. The assessment can also include questions about the confidence level to distinguish clear awareness from vague impressions. For instance, the individual may be asked to wager a bet to indicate how certain they are that a stimulus was present.

The Perceptual Awareness Scale is an influential subjective measure of awareness. It asks individuals to rate their experience on a scale of four levels: no experience, brief glimpse, almost clear, and clear. A key motivation for this approach is to allow individuals to report vague contents without exact knowledge of what was experienced, distinguishing faint impressions as a form of awareness from the absence of awareness. (Note: This distinction can be relevant to research on subliminal perceptions and the question of whether they are unconscious in the fullest sense.)

The mirror test assesses self-awareness in animals by evaluating whether they recognize their reflection in a mirror.

Objective measures infer awareness from observable behavior or physiological signals. One approach relies on task performance, such as forced-choice discrimination. For example, an individual may be presented with a stimulus needed to solve a problem or choose a correct answer. If their performance is better than chance would predict, this is interpreted as an indication that the individual was aware of the stimulus. Another objective measure uses neuroimaging, such as functional magnetic resonance imaging, to analyze brain activity and identify neural patterns associated with awareness. This method is available even for individuals who cannot communicate their experience. For example, brain scans of individuals in a vegetative state may reveal brain activity associated with awareness despite their inability to respond to their surroundings. Some research methods are tailored to specific forms of awareness. For example, the mirror test is a method to assess self-awareness in animals: the ability of an animal to respond to a mark on its body only visible in a mirror is often interpreted as evidence that the animal recognizes itself.

Both subjective and objective measures have limitations. Subjective measures are more direct indicators of awareness by reflecting how people experience its contents. However, reports of awareness are not always accurate: individuals may fail to report vague impressions, may have forgotten an experience by the time they are asked, or may confabulate non-existent contents of awareness to explain their behavior after the fact. Another obstacle is the observer paradox: monitoring a cognitive process can influence this process, meaning that the experienced contents may be different from the contents that would have been present without the monitoring.

A central challenge for objective measures is that the factors they track are not necessarily correlated with awareness. For example, performance above chance level may be caused by cognitive processes outside conscious awareness, while performance at chance level can happen despite awareness if an individual fails to use the relevant information. Similarly, when brain scans reveal neural patterns resembling those observed during conscious awareness, this evidence does not definitively establish that the person is aware. Some studies combine subjective and objective measures in a complementary approach, for example, by comparing performance with self-reported awareness. Research may also include insights from first-person approaches, such as phenomenology and introspective psychology, in which researchers systematically examine and describe their own awareness.

== In various fields ==
=== Philosophy ===
Higher-order theories of consciousness hold that a mental state becomes conscious if another mental state is directed at it (left). First-order representationalism, by contrast, holds that conscious awareness is an intrinsic aspect of conscious mental states (right).

Awareness is relevant to several branches of philosophy, particularly philosophy of mind. Philosophers try to determine its essential features, how it arises and relates to matter, and what functions it plays. Physicalism, dualism, and panpsychism discuss the connection between conscious awareness and matter. Physicalists hold that everything is fundamentally physical. Reductive physicalism argues that consciousness can be reduced to physical processes, such as brain activities, whereas eliminative physicalism asserts that, strictly speaking, there is no conscious awareness, at least not as it is commonly understood. Dualists hold that consciousness is essentially different from matter as a distinct type of substance or property. Panpsychists maintain that everything has mental aspects, meaning that mind is present not only in higher life forms but also in simple matter, even if only in a basic form.

Higher-order theories distinguish between first-order mental states, which are typically directed at the world, such as a perception of a tree, and higher-order mental states, which are directed at other mental states. According to this view, first-order states are not conscious by themselves but become conscious if higher-order states are directed at them. This reflects the idea that conscious awareness is about knowing what happens in one's own mind. First-order representationalism, by contrast, holds that awareness is an intrinsic aspect of conscious mental states, meaning that they do not require a separate higher-order state to become conscious. The idea of the self-representational nature of conscious awareness is challenged by the transparency of experience thesis, which maintains that experience is transparent: it presents properties of the objects of awareness but not properties of experience itself.

Functionalism holds that conscious awareness is defined by the function it performs. According to the integrated information theory, this function is to combine information from several sources. This idea underlies the global workspace theory, which regards consciousness as a limited global workspace that selects and combines the most important information from other cognitive processes, making the information available across the brain. Quantum-based theories propose that quantum effects are essential for generating conscious awareness. (Note: One reason for this approach is to address the binding problem: how cognitive processes in different brain areas can result in a unified experience. It suggests that these areas are linked through quantum entanglement.)

The problems addressed in the philosophy of conscious awareness are sometimes divided into easy and hard problems. The so-called easy problems are challenges to explain how physical systems can implement functions associated with conscious awareness. They contrast with the hard problem of consciousness, which is the challenge of explaining how physical systems can produce subjective experience.

Awareness is also relevant to other branches of philosophy, such as epistemology, phenomenology, ethics, and logic. Epistemology is interested in awareness as a source of knowledge. It compares different types of awareness, such as perceptual and introspective awareness, examining how reliable they are. Phenomenology investigates conscious awareness from the first-person perspective by describing its structure and contents, exploring what it is subjectively like to undergo experiences. In ethics, one area of research studies the moral dimension of awareness: its role in forming intentions and the sense of agency involved in acting. For example, one question is whether moral responsibility depends on awareness of the reasons and values guiding a person. In logic, formal systems for the treatment of awareness, called awareness logics, have been proposed. They often treat awareness as a cognitive attitude toward a proposition and compare its logical properties with those of other cognitive attitudes, such as belief and knowledge.

=== Psychology and clinical medicine ===
Psychology studies awareness from an empirical perspective. Using subjective and objective empirical evidence, such as introspective reports and measured task performance, it examines the conditions under which people become aware of information and how this information influences their behavior. For example, researchers may investigate the threshold at which people become aware of a stimulus and how this threshold depends on intensity, duration, expectations, and competing stimuli. Studied phenomena that influence whether a stimulus reaches awareness include visual masking, in which a brief stimulus is harder to perceive when other stimuli are presented before or after it; visual crowding, in which nearby visual elements make a stimulus more difficult to identify; and inattentional blindness, in which an individual fails to notice an obvious but unexpected stimulus because their attention is focused on another task.

Another research topic concerns the temporal dimension of awareness. The minimum perceptual duration is the shortest duration of a stimulus found in awareness or the briefest span of time experienced as an interval. It contrasts with the specious present, which is a broader interval in which successive events are experienced as integrated into a unified present. Another line of inquiry suggests that conscious awareness is delayed by the time the brain needs to process information, meaning that what people experience as the present is already slightly in the past. (Note: There are disagreements about the magnitudes, variations, and measurement methods of these temporal phenomena. Suggestions include that the minimum perceptual duration is about 0.1 seconds, that the specious present may extend to several seconds, and that conscious experience may be delayed up to 0.5 seconds.)

Developmental psychologists are interested in the development of awareness in the course of an individual's lifetime. For instance, researchers may study how infants become aware of themselves, other people, and objects; and how this awareness changes as they grow up.

Both psychology and clinical medicine are concerned with the nature and treatment of disorders that affect awareness. Unilateral spatial neglect is a condition caused by brain damage that limits awareness of and attention to objects and events on one side of a person's surroundings. For example, someone with left-side neglect may ignore food on the left side of their plate and eat only the portion on the right. In Capgras syndrome, a person still recognizes someone they know but lacks an awareness of familiarity with them, which involves the impression that they are dealing with an impostor that merely looks and acts like someone they know. Some forms of psychosis can involve severe disturbances of external awareness as individuals experience hallucinations and have difficulties in distinguishing what is real from what is not. The coherence and continuity of awareness can be impaired in dissociative disorders. For instance, dissociative amnesia involves memory gaps in which a person lacks awareness of specific past events they experienced, which can occur for traumatic events. In the dissociative identity disorder, a person has several identities or personality states that may alternately take control, with each identity often having a limited awareness of the others.

Another topic in clinical medicine is anesthesia, which is a controlled temporary loss of awareness. It is particularly relevant for otherwise painful medical procedures, which are often performed only after a patient has received an anesthetic to reduce or prevent pain. Anesthesia can be either local or general. Local anesthesia affects the awareness of sensations of a particular part of the body, such as numbing the mouth before pulling a tooth. General anesthesia affects awareness as a whole and produces a general state of unconsciousness, which can be required for major surgeries.

=== Neuroscience ===
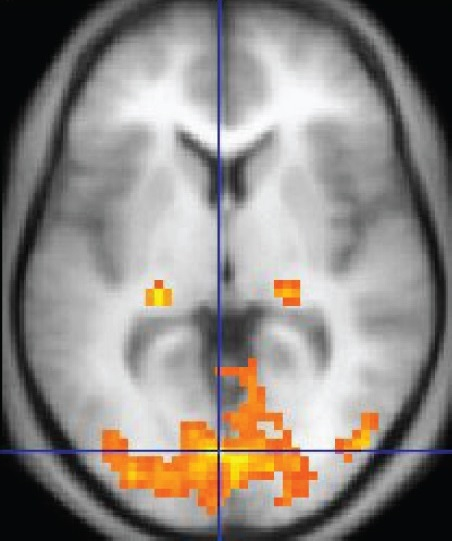
Neuroimaging, such as functional magnetic resonance imaging, is one way of studying awareness.

The neuroscientific study of awareness explores the relation between the brain and awareness. It often uses neuroimaging techniques, such as functional magnetic resonance imaging, to examine patterns of neural activity involved in awareness. One goal is to identify neural correlates of awareness: brain regions and events that accompany awareness or contribute to it. Research has identified brain areas involved in specific forms of awareness. For example, the visual cortex is involved in visual awareness, and the auditory cortex is involved in auditory awareness. However, research indicates that no single brain area seems to be necessary for all forms of awareness. Additional difficulties in answering this question are posed by cognitive redundancy, in which different brain areas can perform the same function and compensate for each other, and neuroplasticity, in which one area may take over functions of another brain area that has been damaged.

Another topic in this field is the binding problem: the question of how information processed in different parts of the brain comes together to yield a unified awareness of the world. Further questions concern the effects of neurochemistry on awareness, including how psychoactive drugs lead to altered states of awareness. Other research topics are the influences of brain stimulation and brain injury on awareness.

=== Other fields ===
Several religious traditions attribute spiritual significance to specific forms of awareness. For example, some schools of Buddhism emphasize mindfulness as a nonjudgmental awareness associated with equanimity. Some traditions describe special religious or mystical experiences in which individuals become aware of a divine presence in nature, God's will, or a fundamental unity underlying all reality. A different suggestion considers the existence of a pure or objectless awareness in which no contents are experienced, meaning that an individual remains aware without being aware of any particular object or impression. (Note: Another example from the philosophy of Jiddu Krishnamurti is choiceless awareness: a state of consciousness in which an individual is completely aware of the present as an impartial observer, free from social conditioning, evaluation, and distortion.) Some traditions suggest that conscious awareness has metaphysical significance as a fundamental aspect of reality. For instance, the Hindu school of Samkhya proposes a dualist philosophy that identifies two fundamental principles of reality: pure conscious awareness (Purusha) and materiality (Prakriti). Kashmir Shaivism, another school of Indian philosophy, regards universal consciousness (citi) as a basic constituent of the universe.

The biological study of awareness includes animal awareness, addressing questions about its nature and variations across species. One line of research concerns self-awareness, or the sense of self in different animals, for example, by assessing whether animals recognize themselves in a mirror. Another area of inquiry explores the evolution of conscious awareness. It examines how it evolved across species and contributes to survival and reproduction. Difficulties in this research include disagreements about the nature of conscious awareness and the methods of measuring it in organisms.

Computer science considers the possibility of creating artificial awareness with computers. Some research focuses on the idea of artificial consciousness involving subjective experience, while other work addresses awareness-related abilities of artificial intelligence, such as the capacity to autonomously gather, analyze, and use relevant information.

Linguistics examines different aspects of language awareness, including syntactic awareness about how words can be arranged to form grammatically correct sentences.

Linguistics examines different aspects of language awareness. Phonemic awareness is an understanding of the basic sound units of a language. (Note: For example, phonemic awareness of the words tree and free includes an understanding that their first phonemes (/t/ and /f/) differ.) It is part of phonological awareness, which also includes a comprehension of how these sounds combine to form more complex patterns, such as an understanding of syllables and rhymes. Morphological awareness is knowledge of how words are formed from smaller units of meaning, such as word roots, prefixes, and suffixes. Syntactic awareness is an explicit understanding of how words can be arranged into sentences following the rules of grammar. Metalinguistic awareness is the ability to reflect on and describe a language, treating it as an explicit object of study rather than an implicit medium of expression.

Sociology is interested in how different forms of awareness influence social behavior, including social and cultural awareness. Social awareness concerns knowledge of social norms and expectations and the ability to comprehend the perspectives and needs of others. Cultural awareness is an understanding of culture-specific values and beliefs, which is important when individuals from different cultures interact. Sociology is further concerned with awareness raising—a form of social activism seeking to affect change by drawing public attention to issues such as gender inequality, racial discrimination, global warming, and specific diseases. The field of computer-supported cooperative work is also interested in how awareness affects social interaction. It treats several types of awareness as essential to effective teamwork, including general knowledge of co-workers, awareness of their responsibilities and activities, and knowledge of the current state of a shared workspace. Another topic in this field is awareness systems: technologies that help individuals remain aware of the activities and situation of their colleagues.

Marketing research examines how the awareness of consumers influences economic decisions. Brand awareness refers to the ability of consumers to recall and recognize a brand. It influences purchasing behavior since customers are typically more likely to choose products from brands they recognize. Top-of-mind awareness is a type of brand awareness: it concerns the first brand that comes to a customer's mind when they think of a particular type of product.

== See also ==
- Awareness ribbon – Symbol intended to show support or bring attention to a cause
