= Response priming =

Psychology experiment

In the psychology of perception and motor control, the term response priming denotes a special form of priming. Generally, priming effects take place whenever a response to a target stimulus is influenced by a prime stimulus presented at an earlier time. The distinctive feature of response priming is that prime and target are presented in quick succession (typically, less than 100 milliseconds apart) and are coupled to identical or alternative motor responses. When a speeded motor response is performed to classify the target stimulus, a prime immediately preceding the target can thus induce response conflicts when assigned to a different response as the target. These response conflicts have observable effects on motor behavior, leading to priming effects, e.g., in response times and error rates. A special property of response priming is its independence from visual awareness of the prime.

== Response priming as a visuomotor effect ==
In 1962, Fehrer and Raab reported experiments where participants were required to press a single key as quickly as possible upon presentation of a visual target stimulus. The visibility of the target was strongly reduced by so-called metacontrast masking (see below). The authors found that the response times were independent of the subjective visibility of the target, i.e., responses to well-visible targets were just as fast as those to nearly invisible targets (Fehrer-Raab effect). The term response priming was first employed by Rosenbaum and Kornblum with respect to an experimental paradigm where different aspects of motor responses were primed by visual stimuli. The modern procedure of response priming was developed in the 1980s and 1990s by Peter Wolff, Werner Klotz, Ulrich Ansorge, and Odmar Neumann at the University of Bielefeld, Germany. The paradigm was developed further in the 1990s by a research team led by Dirk Vorberg at the University of Braunschweig, Germany.

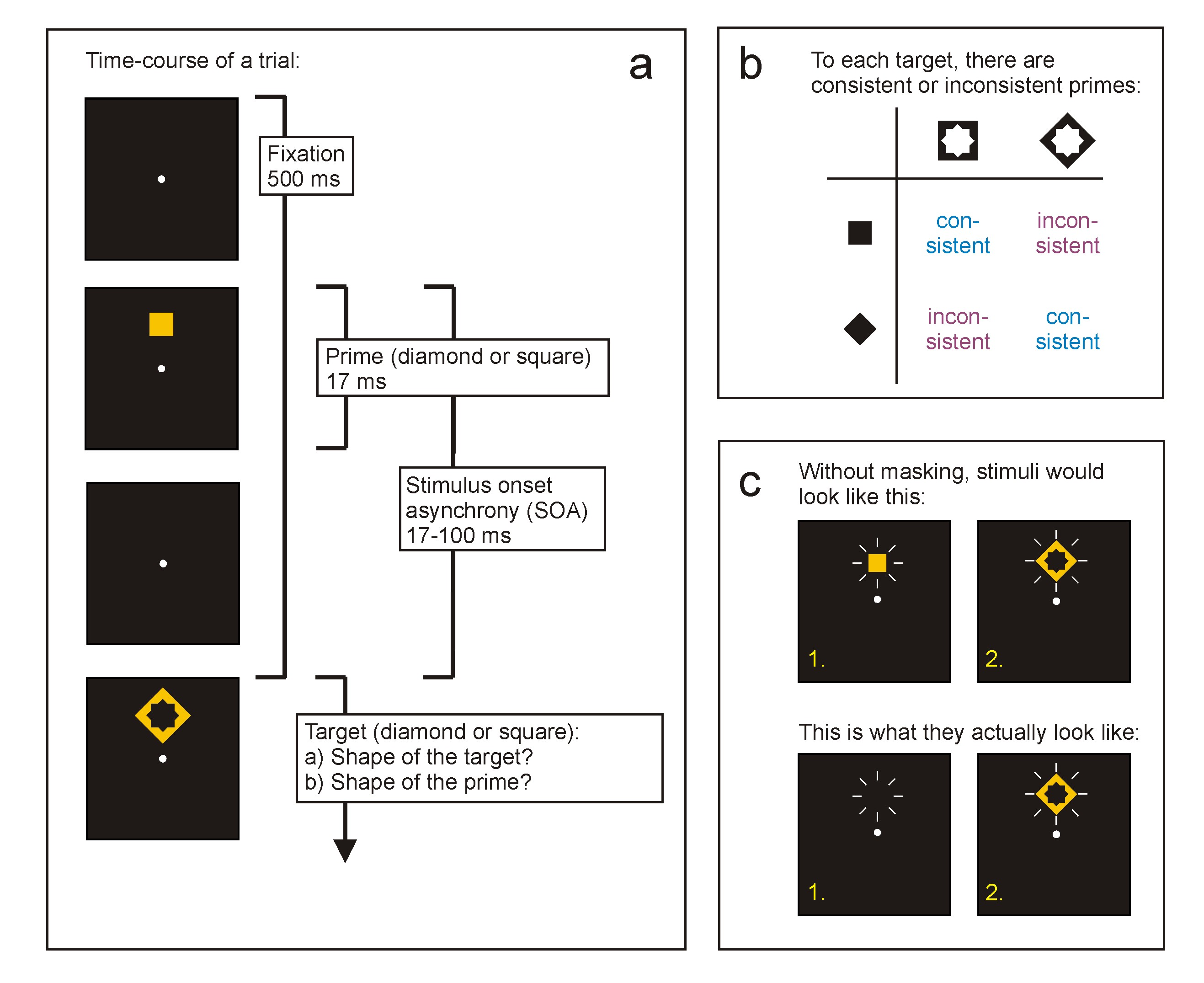
Fig. 1 a

Typical time course of a trial in a response priming paradigm. Here, the participant responds as quickly as possible to the shape of the target stimulus (diamond or square) by pressing the assigned response key. Shortly before, a prime is presented (also a diamond or square) that influences the response to the target. The time interval between prime onset and target onset is called the "stimulus-onset asynchrony" (SOA). In many response priming experiments, the target also serves to visually mask the prime. Therefore, a second task is often employed where participants are asked to identify the masked prime. b) Prime and target are consistent when assigned to the same response, and inconsistent when assigned to different responses. c) The visibility of the prime can be strongly influenced by masking effects from the target.

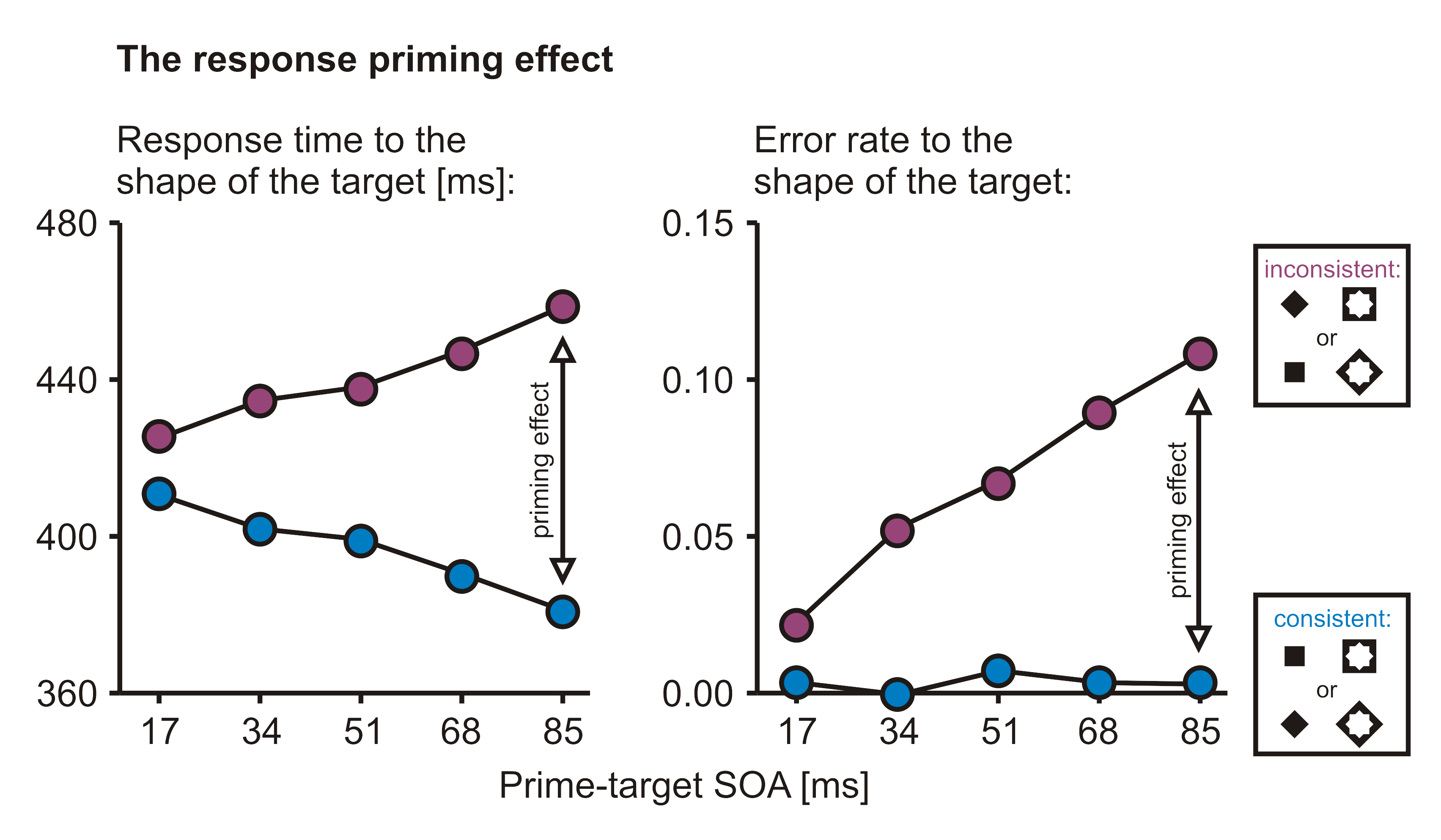
Fig. 2: Typical time course of response priming effects (fictitious data). Consistent primes (blue) speed responses to the target, inconsistent primes (purple) slow them. In addition, consistent primes only rarely lead to response errors, whereas error rates can be very high for inconsistent primes. In response times as well as error rates, priming effects typically increase with SOA.

In all response priming paradigms, participants have to respond to a specific target stimulus. In a simple experiment, this could be one of two geometric stimuli, each of which is assigned to one of two response keys (e.g., diamond - left key; square - right key). The experiment consists of a large number of trials where the participant presses the left key upon appearance of a diamond, and the right key upon appearance of a square, as quickly and correctly as possible. In each trial, the target is preceded by a prime that is also a diamond or square, and therefore able to elicit the same motor responses as the target (Fig. 1a). If prime and target are linked to the same response (diamond preceded by diamond, square preceded by square), they are called "consistent" (also "congruent", "compatible"); if they are linked to different motor responses (diamond preceded by square, square preceded by diamond), they are called "inconsistent" (also "incongruent", "incompatible"; Fig. 1b). The time interval between onset of the prime and onset of the target is called "stimulus onset asynchrony" (SOA). Typically, SOAs up to 100 milliseconds (ms) are employed.

Priming effects occur when the prime influences the motor response to the target: consistent primes speed responses to the target, whereas inconsistent primes slow responses (Fig. 2). Priming effects in response times are calculated by taking the difference between response times in inconsistent and consistent trials. Apart from their effects on response speed, primes can greatly affect the rate of response errors (i.e., erroneous responses to the target): consistent primes rarely lead to errors, whereas error rates can become very high for inconsistent primes. In response times as well as error rates, priming effects typically increase with SOA, leading to the typical response priming patterns in Fig. 2. This implies that the more time is elapsing between prime and target, the larger the prime's influences on the response. For average response times of 350-450 ms, the response priming effect can become as large as 100 ms, making it one of the numerically largest effects in response time research.

Results from many experiments show that the increase of priming with SOA occurs because the prime has an increasing amount of time to influence the response process before the actual target stimulus can come into play and control the motor response on its own. This is evident from the time-course of motor activity in the EEG, from primed pointing responses, from measurements of response force, and from simulation studies, which all suggest that motor activation first occurs in the direction specified by the prime, and only then proceeds in the direction specified by the actual target. Therefore, the ultimate size of the priming effect depends both on properties of the stimuli and on properties of the task. Primes with high stimulus energy (e.g., higher contrast, longer duration) and tasks with easy stimulus discriminations lead to large priming effects, whereas primes with low stimulus energy and tasks with difficult discriminations lead to smaller effects. Priming effects can be amplified by visual attention directed to the prime's position or to its relevant features just in time for the prime's appearance.

The time course of the response priming effect described so far only holds for SOAs up to about 100 ms. For longer SOAs, the priming effect can increase further. Under some circumstances, however, a reversal of the effect can be observed where inconsistent primes lead to faster responses to the target than do consistent primes. This effect is known as the "negative compatibility effect".

== Masked priming ==
Response priming can be employed to investigate phenomena of perception without awareness. Here, the visibility of the prime can be systematically reduced or even abolished by means of a masking stimulus. This can be accomplished by presenting the masking stimulus shortly before or after the prime. The prime's visibility can be assessed by different measures, such as forced-choice discrimination tasks, stimulus detection judgments, brightness judgments, and others. A phenomenon named metacontrast masking can be produced when the prime is followed by a mask enclosing the prime's shape such that both stimuli share adjacent contours. For instance, a prime can be masked by a larger annulus whose inner contours exactly fit the prime's shape. In many response priming experiments, the target serves the additional purpose of masking the prime (Fig. 1). Metacontrast is a form of visual backward masking where the visibility of the prime is reduced by a stimulus following the prime.

In Fig. 3, some typical time-courses of visual masking effects are shown as a function of the prime-target SOA, in a response-priming experiment where the target itself serves as a masking stimulus (Fig. 1a, c). Here, the measure of prime visibility could be the discrimination performance of a participant trying to guess the shape of the prime (diamond or square) in each trial. Without masking, performance would be nearly perfect; the participant would have little difficulty classifying the prime correctly as a square or a diamond in every trial. In contrast, if masking was complete, discrimination performance would be at chance level (Fig. 3, left panel). In many experiments, however, the time-course of masking is less extreme (Fig. 3, right panel). Most stimulus conditions lead to so-called "type-A masking", where the degree of masking is highest at short SOAs and then diminishes, so that the prime becomes easier to discriminate for increasing SOAs. Under some circumstances, however, "type-B masking" can be obtained, where the degree of masking is highest at intermediate SOAs but where the prime becomes easier to discriminate at shorter or longer SOAs. Type-B masking can occur with metacontrast masking but critically depends on stimulus properties of primes and targets. In addition, the time-course of masking can vary greatly from person to person.

== Independence of response priming from visual awareness ==
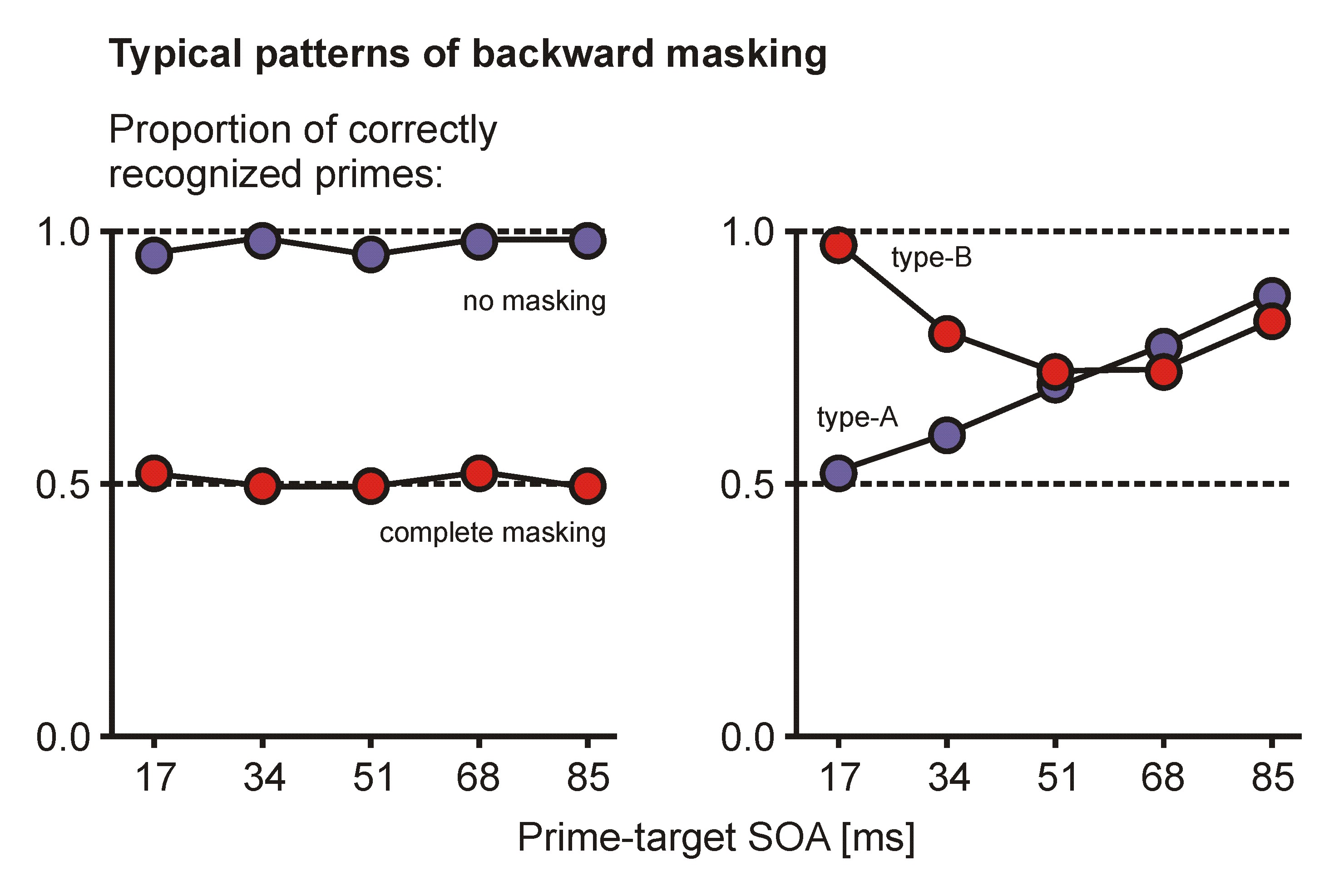
Fig. 3: Typical patterns of backward masking (fictitious data). When a participant tries to identify the prime, response accuracy depends on the degree of masking. Without masking, the prime is identified with nearly perfect accuracy (purple), while accuracy drops to chance level (50 %) when masking is complete (left panel). Depending on the type of mask, other time-courses of masking are possible (right panel). In type-A masking, the degree of masking is highest when prime and target follow each other at short SOAs, and decreases with SOA (purple). In type-B masking, the degree of masking is stronger at intermediate SOAs than at shorter or longer SOAs (red). Type-B time-courses can be obtained in metacontrast masking under specific stimulus conditions.

Experiments show that the time-course of the response priming effect (increasing effects with increasing SOA) is independent of the degree and time-course of masking. Klotz and Neumann (1999) demonstrated response priming effects under complete masking of the prime. Extending these findings to other time-courses of visual masking, Vorberg et al. varied the time-course of masking by controlling the relative duration of primes and targets. In their experiments, targets were arrows pointing left or right, while primes were smaller arrows metacontrast-masked by the targets. When participants tried to identify the pointing direction of the primes, any of the time-courses depicted in Fig. 3 could be produced depending on stimulus conditions: complete visibility, complete masking, type-A masking, and type-B masking. However, when participants had to respond as quickly as possible to the direction of the target, priming effects in all those conditions were virtually identical. Moreover, the time-course of priming was always the same (increasing priming effect with increasing SOA), no matter whether the primes were visible or invisible and no matter whether visibility increased or decreased with SOA.

Of special interest is the case where priming effects are increasing even though prime visibility is decreasing. Such opposite time-coursse of priming and visual awareness of the prime clearly show that both processes rely on different mechanisms. This finding could be confirmed in many further experiments revealing numerous dissociations between masking and priming. The independence of priming and visual awareness clearly contradicts the traditional notion that effects of unconscious perception merely reflect some residual processing ability under very unfavorable viewing conditions, something that remains after a prime stimulus has been degraded so severely that conscious awareness of it has decreased below some "threshold". This conception has often led to sharp criticism of research on unconscious or "subliminal" perception, but it is probably wrong on a basic level. Instead, motor activation by masked primes is obviously independent of processes of backward masking, provided that visibility is controlled only by the masking stimulus while the prime stimulus remains unchanged. In other words: for a short time and under suitable experimental conditions, visually masked (invisible) stimuli can influence motor responses just as effectively as visible ones.

== Variants ==
Given that the researcher is aware of the most influential experimental variables, the response priming method can be employed in a number of experimental variants and can contribute to the exploration of a multitude of research questions in the field of cognitive psychology. The most prevalent form of response priming employs a prime and target at the same monitor position, so that the target also serves to visually mask the prime (often by means of metacontrast). In many experiments, there are two different targets preceded by two different primes at the same monitor positions. Participants then have to discriminate the two targets and respond to the position of the task-relevant target. Sometimes, three stimulus types are employed (prime, mask, target), especially when the prime-target SOA has to be very long. Sometimes, no mask is employed at all. Primes and targets do not have to appear at the same screen position: one stimulus can flank the other, like in the Eriksen paradigm (indeed, the Eriksen effect may be a special case of response priming).

Response-priming effects have been demonstrated for a large number of stimuli and discrimination tasks, including geometric stimuli, color stimuli, various types of arrows, natural images (animals vs. objects), vowels and consonants, letters, and digits. In one study, chess configurations were presented as primes and targets, and participants had to decide whether the king was in check. Mattler (2003) could show that response priming can not only influence motor responses, but also works for cognitive operations like a spatial shift of visual attention or a shift between two different response time tasks. Different types of masking have been employed as well. Instead of measuring keypress responses (commonly with two response alternatives), some studies use more than two response alternatives or record speech responses, speeded finger pointing movements, eye movements, or so-called readiness potentials which reflect the degree of motor activation in the brain's motor cortex and can be measured by electro-encephalographic methods. Brain imaging methods like functional magnetic resonance imaging (fMRI) have been employed as well.

== Theories ==
In the part that follows, three theories that explain the regular, positive response priming effects will be described. A review of theories of the negative compatibility effect can be found in Sumner (2007).

=== Direct parameter specification ===
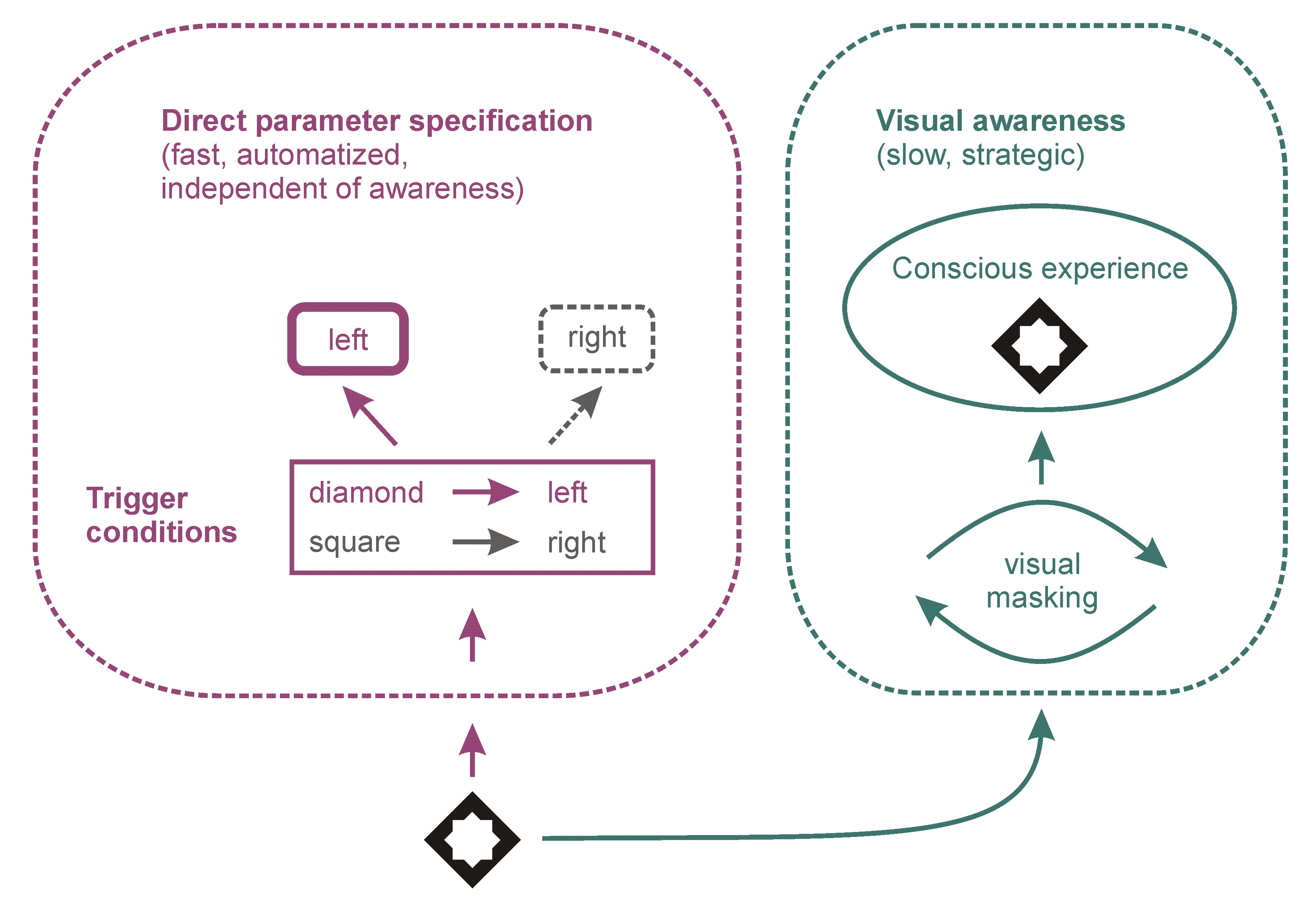
Fig. 4: Central tenets of direct parameter specification theory and the action trigger account. When the response to a target stimulus is sufficiently practiced, the response can be prepared to a degree where only a single critical stimulus feature is needed to specify and elicit the response. Response elicitation by the prime occurs quickly and directly without the need for a conscious representation of the stimulus. In parallel to these visuomotor processes, a conscious representation of primes and targets emerges which can be subject to visual masking but plays no role in the actual motor processing in the current trial. More recent variants of the theory stress the role of so-called trigger conditions which determine how stimuli and responses are linked in a given task.

The theory of direct parameter specification (Fig. 4) was proposed by Odmar Neumann at the University of Bielefeld, Germany, to explain the Fehrer-Raab effect as well as the results of early response priming studies. The theory assumes that at the outset of a response priming experiment, participants acquire rules of stimulus-response assignment, which quickly become automatized. Following this practice phase, the motor response can be prepared so far that only a single critical stimulus feature (e.g., diamond vs. square) is still needed to specify the response. This incoming stimulus feature then defines the last missing action parameter (e.g., left vs. right keypress). Responses are elicited quickly and directly, without the need for a conscious representation of the eliciting stimulus. Response priming is explained by assuming that the prime's features elicit exactly the same parameter specification processes that are supposed to be elicited by the target stimulus. In parallel to the response elicitation process, a conscious representation of primes and targets emerges, which can be subject to visual masking processes. However, the conscious representation of the stimuli doesn't play any role for the motor processes in the current experimental trial.

=== Action trigger account ===
The action trigger account was developed by Wilfried Kunde, Andrea Kiesel, and Joachim Hoffmann at the University of Würzburg, Germany. This account assumes that responses to unconscious primes are neither elicited by semantic analysis of the primes nor by pre-established stimulus-response mappings. Instead, it is assumed that the prime fits a pre-existing action release condition, eliciting the assigned response like a key opening a lock. This happens in two consecutive steps. In the first step, action triggers are held active in working memory that fit the respective task and are able to elicit a specific motor response. Action triggers are established in the instruction and practice phase of the experiment. In the second step, called online stimulus processing, an upcoming stimulus is compared to the action release conditions. If the stimulus fits the trigger conditions, the action triggers automatically execute the response. As an example, the participant's task might be to indicate whether a visually presented number is smaller or larger than five, such that the left-hand key is pressed for numbers "1" to "4" and the right-hand key is pressed for numbers "6" to "9". Based on the instruction, action triggers are set up that automatically elicit the response assigned to the prime or target number. One important prediction of this theory is that responses can be elicited by primes that meet the trigger conditions but never actually occur as targets. A later version of the action trigger account asserts that the semantic representations of primes can serve as action release conditions.

Again, the conscious representation of the stimulus plays no role for motor activation; however, it can lead to a strategic adjustment of response criteria in later trials (e.g., by choosing to respond more slowly to avoid errors). In sum, this theory can be viewed as expanding on the concept of direct parameter specification by focusing on the exact conditions that lead to response priming.

=== Rapid-chase theory ===
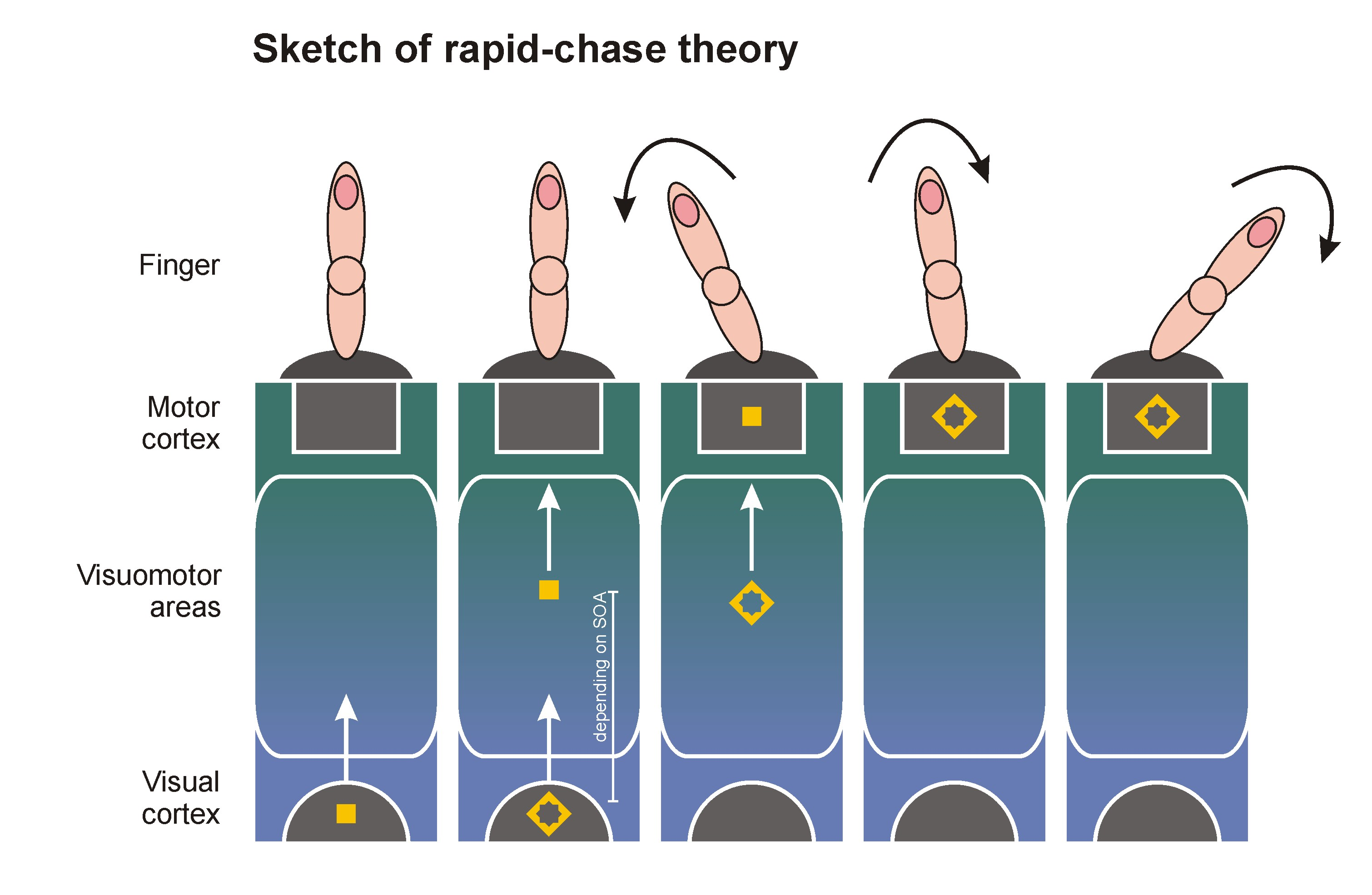
Fig. 4: A schematic depiction of rapid-chase theory. Primes and targets are engaged in a chase through the visuomotor system (from visual to motor areas). Because the prime signal has a head-start over the target signal, it is able to start a motor response assigned to it and to control this response for as long as the prime-target SOA allows. When the actual target signal then arrives in the motor system, it can follow through with the response already activated by the prime (in consistent trials) or has to reverse the response (in inconsistent trials). Rapid-chase theory assumes that primes and targets elicit feedforward cascades of neuronal activation traversing the visuomotor system in strict sequence, without mixture or overlap of prime and target signals. Therefore, the initial motor response to the prime must be independent of all stimulus aspects of the actual target.

The rapid-chase theory of response priming was proposed in 2006 by Thomas Schmidt, Silja Niehaus, and Annabel Nagel. It ties the direct parameter specification model to findings that newly occurring visual stimuli elicit a wave of neuronal activation in the visuomotor system, which spreads rapidly from visual to motor areas of the cortex. Because the wavefront of activity spreads very fast, Victor Lamme and Pieter Roelfsema from the University of Amsterdam have proposed that this wave starts as a pure feedforward process (feedforward sweep): A cell first reached by the wavefront has to pass on its activity before being able to integrate feedback from other cells. Lamme and Roelfsema assume that this kind of feedforward processing is not sufficient to generate visual awareness of the stimulus: For this, neuronal feedback and recurrent processing loops are required that link widespread neuronal networks.

According to rapid-chase theory, both primes and targets elicit feedforward sweeps that traverse the visuomotor system in rapid succession until they reach motor areas of the brain. There, motor processes are elicited automatically and without the need for a conscious representation. Because the prime signal has a head-start over the target signal, primes and targets are engaged in a "rapid chase" through the visuomotor system. Because the prime signal reaches the motor cortex first, it is able to activate the motor response assigned to it. The shorter the prime-target SOA, the quicker the target can start the pursuit. When the target signal finally arrives at the motor cortex, it can continue the response process elicited by the prime (if prime and target are consistent) or redirect the response process (if prime and target are inconsistent). This explains why response priming effects increase with prime-target SOA: the longer the SOA, the more time for the prime signal to control the response on its own, and the further the response activation process can proceed in the direction of the prime. Under some circumstances, the prime can also provoke a response error (leading to the characteristic priming effects in error rates). Such a time-course of sequential motor control by primes and targets was described in 2003 by Dirk Vorberg and coworkers in a mathematical model and fits the time-course of primed motor potentials in the EEG.

According to rapid-chase theory, response priming effects are independent of visual awareness because they are carried by rapid feedforward processes whereas the emergence of a conscious representation of the stimuli is dependent on slower, recurrent processes. The most important prediction of rapid-chase theory is that the feedforward sweeps of prime and target signals should occur in strict sequence. This strict succession should be observable in the time-course of the motor response, and there should be an early phase where the response is controlled exclusively by the prime and is independent of all properties of the actual target stimulus. One way to check these predictions is to examine the time-course of primed pointing responses. It has been shown that these pointing responses start at a fixed time after presentation of the prime (not the actual target) and start to proceed in the direction specified by the prime. If prime and target are inconsistent, the target is often able to reverse the pointing direction "on the fly", directing the response into the correct direction. However, the longer the SOA, the longer the time where the finger is moving in the direction of the misleading prime. Schmidt, Niehaus, and Nagel (2006) could show that the earliest phase of primed pointing movements exclusively depends on properties of the prime (e.g., the color contrast of red vs. green primes), but is independent of all properties of the target (its time of occurrence, its color contrast, and its ability to mask the prime). These findings could be confirmed with different methods and different types of stimuli.

Because rapid-chase theory views response priming as a feedforward process, it maintains that priming effects occur before recurrent and feedback activity take part in stimulus processing. The theory therefore leads to the controversial thesis that response priming effects are a measure of preconscious processing of visual stimuli, which may be qualitatively different from the way those stimuli are finally represented in visual awareness.

== See also ==
- Attentional blink
- Auditory masking
- Pre-attentive processing
- Unconscious thought theory § Criticism of UTT
- Visual masking
