= Refractory (disambiguation) =

A refractory is a heat-resistant material, such as:

- Refractory ceramic, a ceramic that is resistant to heat
- Refractory metals, metals that are resistant to heat and wear

Refractory may also refer to:

- Refractory (astronomy), any material, which condenses at high temperature
- Refractory clergymen: Roman Catholic priests and bishops in France who refused to swear an oath of allegiance to the state during the Civil Constitution of the Clergy
- Refractory disease, one not responsive to common modes of treatment
- Refractory period (disambiguation), a period immediately following a stimulus during which further stimulation has no effect
  - Refractory period (physiology), the time after an action potential during which a membrane can not depolarize
  - Refractory period (sex), a period after orgasm during which it is impossible to achieve another orgasm
  - Psychological refractory period, the delay in response to the second of two closely spaced psychological stimuli
  - Postictal state, the period following a series of epileptic seizures during which seizures cannot be induced
