= Refractory period =

Refractory period is a period immediately following a stimulus during which further stimulation has no effect. It may specifically refer to:

- Refractory period (physiology), recovery time of an excitable membrane to be ready for a second stimulus once it returns to its resting state, following excitation in the areas of biology, physiology and cardiology
- Refractory period (sex), the recovery phase after orgasm during which it is physiologically impossible for an individual to have additional orgasms
- Psychological refractory period, the delay in response to the second of two closely spaced psychological stimuli
- Postictal state, the period following a series of epileptic seizures during which seizures cannot be induced

== See also ==
- Refractory (disambiguation)
