= Herman Bouma =

Dutch vision researcher and gerontechnologist

Herman Bouma (born 15 March 1934) is a Dutch vision researcher and gerontechnologist. He is considered to be one of the founders of the field of gerontechnology. He spent the majority of his career at the Institute of Perception Research, serving as its director from the mid-1970s until 1994. He subsequently led the Institute for Gerontechnology until 1999. A perceptual law, based on a publication of his in 1970 is named Bouma's Law in his honour.

== Career ==
Bouma was born in Harderwijk on 15 March 1934. He obtained a degree in physics from Utrecht University and also partially studied medicine there. In 1959 Bouma started working for the Institute of Perception Research (Dutch:Instituut voor Perceptie Onderzoek, IPO), an institute of Philips Research and the Eindhoven University of Technology. In 1965 he obtained his PhD at Eindhoven University of Technology under Jan Frederik Schouten with a thesis titled: "Receptive systems mediating certain light reactions of the pupil of the human eye".

In 1968 Bouma became teamleader of visual research at the IPO. In 1975 or 1978 he became director of the IPO and served until 1994. After this position he was director of the Institute for Gerontechnology at Eindhoven University of Technology from 1994 to 1999. He also continued as a part-time professor at the university. On his retirement the Herman Bouma Fund for Gerontechnology was set up.

== Research ==
Bouma's research on perception has focused on visual perception. He specialized in reading processes and visual searching and also conducted work on dyslexia. In a famous paper in 1970 he laid the foundation to what is now called Bouma's Law. Bouma further laid groundwork on the spectral dependency of the human pupillary response. His later work led to applications in the field of reading from displays.

In 1990 Bouma started working in the field of gerontechnology. Together with Jan Graafmans and Tony Brouwers, Bouma he has been called one of the inventors of the discipline of gerontechnology by J.E.M.H. van Bronswijk. Bouma devoted half of his output in journals to gerontechnology.

Bouma was elected a member of the Royal Netherlands Academy of Arts and Sciences in 1992. The next year he was named a Knight in the Order of the Netherlands Lion.
