= Visual crowding =

Visual phenomenon

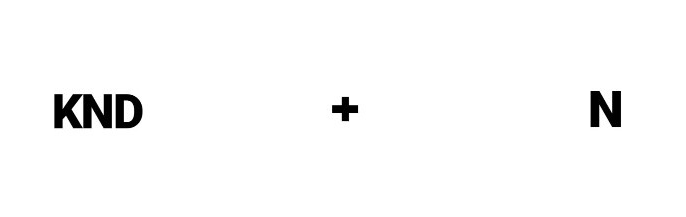
Crowding makes a target that is easily recognizable in isolation, unrecognizable in clutter. When looking directly at the '+' the letter 'N' presented in the right is more easily recognized than the N in the clutter 'KND'

Visual crowding is the inability to view a target stimulus distinctly when presented in a clutter. Crowding impairs the ability to discriminate object features and contours among flankers, which in turn impairs people's ability to respond appropriately to the target stimulus.

An operational definition of crowding explains what crowding is and how it is different from similar effects such as masking, lateral interaction and surround suppression; effects that make the target more challenging to see as well. There are different criteria that are used to differentiate crowding from these other effects. Firstly, crowding makes it difficult to identify an object but not detecting it among the clutter. Crowded objects are collectively perceived to have high contrast, but they remain indistinct. The eccentricity of the target and the distance between the target and flankers influence crowding. As the distance between the target and the flankers' increases at a given eccentricity the ability to detect the target also improves as the eccentricity of a target is increased the more it pops out from the flankers and the more easily it is identified.

Crowding is anisotropic, which means it has different values when measured in different directions. Radially positioned flankers make it harder to identify the target than tangentially positioned ones. Crowding is stronger in the upper field of the four quadrants than the lower ones. A recent study tells us that crowding is intense where the distractor and the target are in the same visual field than when they are in separate visual fields despite equal retinal distance. Crowding is also asymmetrical meaning that a single flanker at an eccentric locus higher than the target makes it harder to identify the target than the single flanker at an eccentric locus closer to the fovea. Crowding is not just a spatial phenomenon it happens over time as well, when a target is moving it is found to be more crowded when the flankers are leading than when they follow the target.

== Information that survives crowding ==
There is much information that gets through to peoples conscious even under the circumstances of crowding these include the appearance of a feature, people can easily perceive the appearance of a feature but cannot identify or discriminate the changes in this feature. Secondly, After effects from adaptation survive crowding, adapting to a target in a crowded stimulus can help people form an orientation[8] and track the motion of the target. Next is combined orientation, even though people are not able to tell the individual orientation of a target stimulus in a crowded setting, they can reliably report an average combined orientation of the stimulus, which means that the orientation signals from the target stimulus are combined than lost.

Some target identity information survives crowding, people can identify more correct targets from a crowded setting when they are asked to report information on both the target and the flanker. Sometimes certain information such as the target information is lost, but the people are able to make better "target " responses in this condition. Some information on the target is preserved, but most of the times the location information is lost.

== Reduction ==
Crowding is broken when the target and stimulus are different than when they are similar. The difference of target group from the flanker group of stimulus in shape, size, orientation, polarity, spatial frequency, depth, color, motion and order, breaks crowding. Crowding happens among faces(holistic crowding) having an inverted face flanker when searching for an upright face breaks crowding. Which makes upright faces more effective flankers. Providing cue about the target location tends to reduce crowding. Crowding is broken when the flankers are collectively masked, but this happens only when the flankers are masked with noise or using metacontrast masks but not with substitution masks. When people are adapted to look for a target stimulus in a certain spatial position, it renders the flankers perceptually invisible (adaptation induced blindness), thus releasing the effect of crowding.

== Mechanism ==
Neurophysiological studies have not made much progress in narrowing down the locus of the brain at which crowding occurs. Previous researches have demonstrated that crowding is "dichoptical" meaning that the target is perceived by one eye and the distractor by the other. Which should mean that the effect of crowding occurs in the cortex. Different researchers have claimed different sites to be the processing center for crowding e.g. (V1, V2, V3, V4 some researchers claim crowding happens at a later stage of visual processing). So, the locus of the brain at which crowding occurs is still not clearly defined.

== Models ==
From the many models that try and explain the process of crowding, there is still a lack of an actual model that helps predict the entirety of how crowding works. All models have three major division that remains as its essence: masking, pooling and substitution. The pooling can be of the low-level features or the pooling of attention. One of the model that nicely predicts is the model by Wilkinson where he boils down the process of crowding to the interaction between complex cells and simple cells, where the simple cells suppress weak complex cell responses and the complex cells respond actively resulted from spatial pooling and then they suppress simple cell activity in their receptive cell area[41].

Another model that best predicts crowding process proposes a quantitative model for a spatial integration of orientation signals, As per the principles of population coding, this model satisfactorily predicts properties like critical spacing, compulsory averaging and the inner and outer asymmetry.

== Levels ==
Different studies implicitly assume that crowding is a unitary effect due to a single stage of processing. The other notion states that crowding happens independently at several stages of visual processing. This notion supports the view that crowding is influenced by the similarity and configuration of flankers and the target. By this notion, the effect is selectively observed between whole objects, object parts, and features. This view is also consistent with Bouma's law. This view has gained much support. Crowding in a natural setting may also occur in layers depending on the location, content and attention dependence.

== Bouma's Law ==
Herman Bouma, a Dutch vision researcher and gerontologist stated, "For complete visual isolation of a letter presented at an eccentricity of φ deg, … no other letters should be present within (roughly) 0.5 φ distance." At a later stage, he reduced the proportionality constant from 0.5 to 0.4. This gave rise to the notion of "critical spacing" which is proportional to the eccentricity. Critical spacing is the sufficient distance needed for the identification of an object among its flankers in the retinotopically organized cortex. Bouma explains how the effect of crowding is dependent on the eccentricity of a subject and the distance between the flankers and the object. Many studies support the claim that critical space needed for crowding depends on the eccentricity of the subject. The proportionality constant named b, after Bouma, is dependent on how similar the flankers are to the target, the number of possible targets, and the arbitrary threshold criterion. The value of Boumas proportionality constant 'b' is different among studies, but most of the times it is reported to be ≈0.4 - 0.5. This rule is sometimes raised to the status of a 'law' but this remains controversial.
