= Hal Pashler =

American psychologist

Hal Pashler is Distinguished Professor of Psychology at University of California, San Diego. An experimental psychologist and cognitive scientist, Pashler is best known for his studies of human attentional limitations (his analysis of the Psychological refractory period effect concluded that the brain has discrete "processing bottlenecks" associated with specific types of cognitive operations). and for his work on visual attention He has also developed and tested new methods for enhancing learning and reducing forgetting, focusing on the temporal spacing of learning and retrieval practice.

Pashler is also known for influential critiques of methodological and statistical practices in behavioral science. His critiques have focused on statistical and logical issues in neuroimaging research ("voodoo correlations"), educational psychology (learning styles concept) testing of mathematical models, and the replicability of “behavioral priming” research in the field of social psychology.

== Education ==
Pashler was born in 1958 in New York. He received his BA in Logic and Philosophy of Science from Brown University in 1980 and his PhD in psychology from the University of Pennsylvania in 1985. He joined the faculty of the University of California, San Diego in 1985.

== Honors ==
Pashler was elected to membership in the Society of Experimental Psychologists in 2000. He is also an elected Fellow of the Association for Psychological Science and the Psychonomic Society. Pashler received the Troland Research Awards from the National Academy of Sciences in 1999; the academy cited his "many experimental breakthroughs in the study of spatial attention and executive control, and... his insightful analysis of human cognitive architecture." He also received the Chancellor's Associates Award for Research given by University of California, San Diego.

== Research career ==
In the 1980s, Pashler and several colleagues developed the Response Selection Bottleneck model of dual-task interference. The model, partly inspired by early work by Alan Welford, makes many predictions about patterns of behavioral response times in the Psychological Refractory Period experiment. The model has been supported by mathematical analyses of behavioral response times and studies of brain activity when people engage in multitasking.

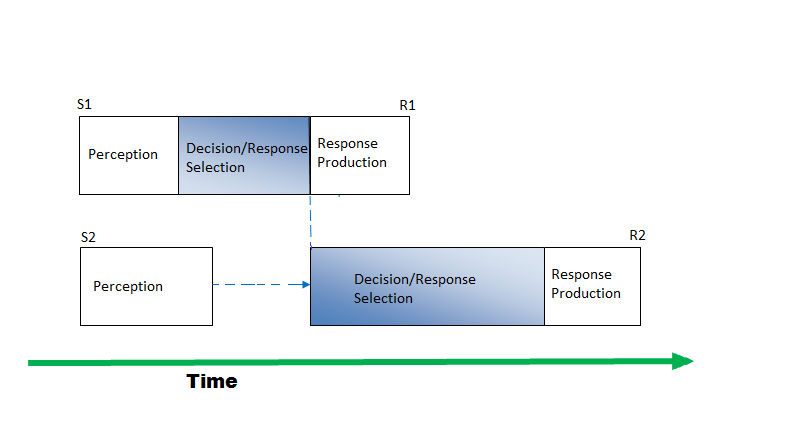
Response Selection Bottleneck Model of Dual-Task Interference

In 1988, Pashler published the first demonstration of the perceptual phenomenon that later came to be called change blindness, using displays of letters that appeared, disappeared, and reappeared (sometimes with alterations). He noted the contrast between observers' subjective sense of awareness of an entire display and their very limited ability to detect even large changes.

In 1992, Pashler (with Mark Carrier) showed that the testing effect (sometimes referred to as Retrieval Practice) directly strengthens associative learning, and does so more effectively than the same time spent re-studying the same associative links. In 2007, Liqiang Huang and Pashler proposed the Boolean Map Theory of visual attention and awareness. The theory argues that a specific type of abstract data structure (the Boolean Map) characterizes the contents of human visual awareness at any given instant in time.

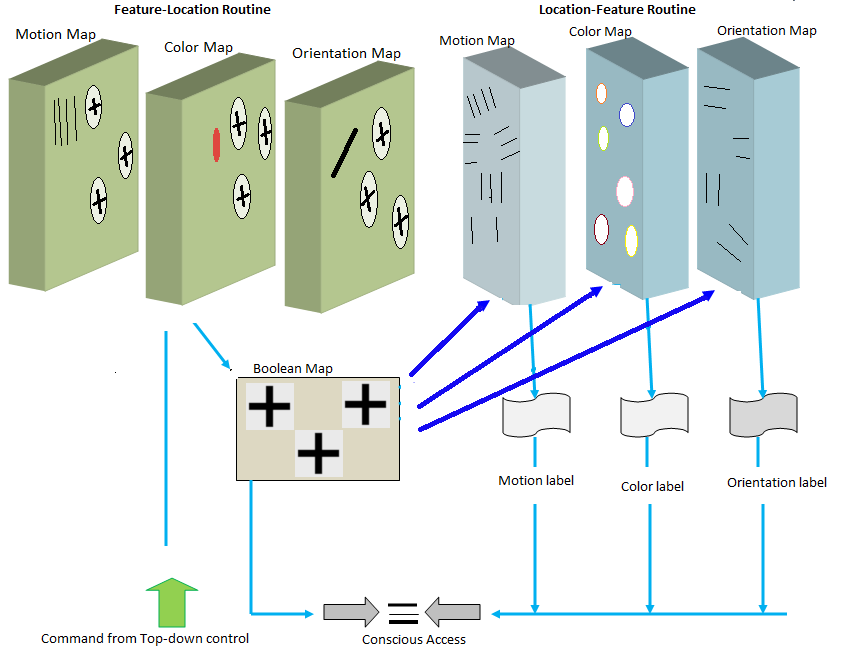
Boolean Map Theory of Attention to Multidimensional Stimuli

In 2008 (with Melody Wiseheart & other collaborators) Pashler carried out the most systematic and long-term studies of the effect of temporal spacing on human learning. Holding total time constant, the team found that when people study information on two occasions separated by a temporal gap G, and then are given a memory test after a further delay D, performance on the test is best when the G is about 10-20% as long as D.

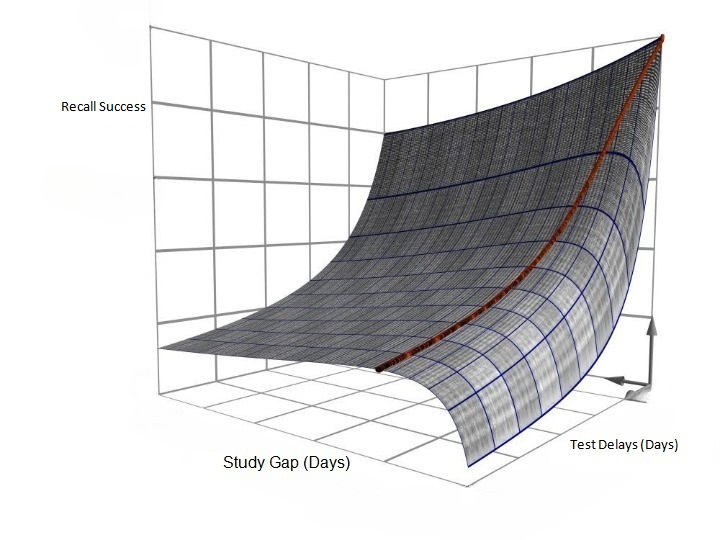
Human Memory as a Joint Function of Inter-Study Gap and Test Delay as revealed in data from Cepeda, Pashler, & Colleagues

(This implies, for example, that if one wishes to study information on two occasions with the goal of retaining it for 1 year, the best practice would be to separate the two study events by about 1 month, whereas if one wished to retain the information for a week, a 1-day gap would work better.) This research is relied upon by some software developers in building spaced-learning apps and websites to help people to retain information more efficiently

In 2006, US Department of Education commissioned Pashler to lead a review of cognitive science findings that could best help guide teachers in scientifically validated instructional practices. The resulting Practice Guide is distributed by the department and is available free of charge on the department's website.

In 2008 (with Edward Vul) Pashler showed that the famous Wisdom of Crowds Effect first noted by Francis Galton could be elicited within a single individual. Averaging two estimates from the same person (their first-choice answer and a second answer elicited later) produced an improvement in accuracy equal to about 1/3 the benefit obtained by averaging estimates from two different people. This discovery, termed the “Inner Crowd Effect” by The Economist helped prompt follow-up research examining potential new methods of improving human judgment accuracy. Pashler has also published several articles on varied topics in political psychology, including biases in perception of newsworthiness and attitudes to pro-liberty views.

== Controversies ==
In 2008, Pashler (along with Vul, Harris, and Winkielman) published a paper initially entitled “Voodoo Correlations in Social Neuroscience” arguing that many of the most prominent research articles in cognitive and social neuroscience had made statistical errors resulting in gross over-estimation of brain-behavior correlation values. The paper (published under the milder title "Puzzlingly Large Correlations...") produced an intense controversy that was covered in popular media as well as academic press. Some writers have pointed to this paper as having helped launch the current period of intensive methodological debate and controversy in behavioral science Statistical practices in brain imaging field appear to have changed in response to the paper with increased use of cross-validation.

In 2009, Pashler chaired a review commissioned by the American Psychological Society examining the validity of the concept of learning styles The review concluded that widely accepted ideas about learning styles lacked serious empirical support and recommended that educators should not base instructional practices on these notions. These conclusions have prompted extensive controversy in the education field. Pashler has also been an outspoken proponent of efforts to increase replicability in psychological research, arguing that many very well-known findings in areas like social cognition and social psychology should not be believed due to statistical errors, publication bias, and other problems. Together with E. J. Wagenmakers, he edited the special issue of the Perspectives on Psychological Science which appears to have introduced the term ‘Replicability Crisis’ in reference to the current state of social and behavioral science.
