= Biomechatronics =

Interdisciplinary science integrating biology and mechatronics

Bio-mechatronics is an applied interdisciplinary science that aims to integrate biology and mechatronics (electrical, electronics, and mechanical engineering). It also encompasses the fields of robotics and neuroscience. Biomechatronic devices cover a wide range of applications, from developing prosthetic limbs to engineering solutions concerning respiration, vision, and the cardiovascular system.

== How it works ==
Bio-mechatronics mimics how the human body works. For example, four different steps must occur to lift the foot to walk. First, impulses from the brain's motor center are sent to the foot and leg muscles. Next, the nerve cells in the feet send information, providing feedback to the brain, enabling it to adjust the muscle groups or amount of force required to walk across the ground. Different amounts of energy are applied depending on the type of surface being walked across. The leg's muscle spindle nerve cells then sense and send the position of the floor back up to the brain. Finally, when the foot is raised to step, signals are sent to muscles in the leg and foot to set it down.

=== Biosensors ===
Biosensors detect what the user wants to do or their intentions and motions. In some devices, the information can is relayed by the user's nervous or muscle system. This information is related by the biosensor to a controller, which can be located inside or outside the biomechatronic device. In addition biosensors receive information about the limb position and force from the limb and actuator. Biosensors come in a variety of forms. They can be wires which detect electrical activity, needle electrodes implanted in muscles, and electrode arrays with nerves growing through them.

=== Electromechanical sensors ===
The purpose of the mechanical sensors is to measure information about the biomechatronic device and relate that information to the biosensor or controller. Additionally, many sensors are being used at schools, such as Case Western Reserve University, the University of Pittsburgh, Johns Hopkins University, among others, with the goal of recording physical stimuli and converting them to neural signals for a subarea of bio-mechatronics called neuro-mechatronics.

=== Controller ===
The controller in a biomechatronic device relays the user's intentions to the actuators. It also interprets feedback information to the user that comes from the biosensors and mechanical sensors. The other function of the controller is to control the biomechatronic device's movements.

=== Actuator ===
The actuator can be an artificial muscle but it can be any part of the system which provides an outward effect based on the control input. For a mechanical actuator, its job is to produce force and movement. Depending on whether the device is orthotic or prosthetic the actuator can be a motor that assists or replaces the user's original muscle. Many such systems actually involve multiple actuators.

== Research ==
Bio-mechatronics is a rapidly growing field but as of now there are very few labs which conduct research. The Shirley Ryan AbilityLab (formerly the Rehabilitation Institute of Chicago), University of California at Berkeley, MIT, Stanford University, and University of Twente in the Netherlands are the researching leaders in bio-mechatronics. Three main areas are emphasized in the current research.

1. Analyzing human motions, which are complex, to aid in the design of biomechatronic devices
2. Studying how electronic devices can be interfaced with the nervous system.
3. Testing the ways to use living muscle tissue as actuators for electronic devices

=== Analyzing motions ===
A great deal of analysis over human motion is needed because human movement is very complex. MIT and the University of Twente are both working to analyze these movements. They are doing this through a combination of computer models, camera systems, and electromyograms.

=== Neural Interfacing ===
Interfacing allows bio-mechatronics devices to connect with the muscle systems and nerves of the user in order send and receive information from the device. This is a technology that is not available in ordinary orthotics and prosthetics devices. Groups at the University of Twente and University of Malaya are making drastic steps in this department. Scientists there have developed a device which will help to treat paralysis and stroke victims who are unable to control their foot while walking. The researchers are also nearing a breakthrough which would allow a person with an amputated leg to control their prosthetic leg through their stump muscles.

Researchers at MIT have developed a tool called the MYO-AMI system which allows for proprioceptive feedback (position sensing) in the lower extremity (legs, transtibial). Still others focus on interfacing for the upper extremity (Functional Neural Interface Lab, CWRU). There are both CNS and PNS approaches further subdivided into brain, spinal cord, dorsal root ganglion, spinal/cranial nerve, and end effector techniques and some purely surgical techniques with no device component (see Targeted Muscle Reinnervation).

=== MIT research ===
Hugh Herr is the leading biomechatronic scientist at MIT. Herr and his group of researchers are developing a sieve integrated circuit electrode and prosthetic devices that are coming closer to mimicking real human movement. The two prosthetic devices currently in the making will control knee movement and the other will control the stiffness of an ankle joint.

==== Robotic fish ====
As mentioned before Herr and his colleagues made a robotic fish that was propelled by living muscle tissue taken from frog legs. The robotic fish was a prototype of a biomechatronic device with a living actuator. The following characteristics were given to the fish.

- A styrofoam float so the fish can float
- Electrical wires for connections
- A silicone tail that enables force while swimming
- Power provided by lithium batteries
- A microcontroller to control movement
- An infrared sensor enables the microcontroller to communicate with a handheld device
- Muscles stimulated by an electronic unit

=== Arts research ===
New media artists at UCSD are using bio-mechatronics in performance art pieces, such as Technesexual (more information, photos, video), a performance which uses biometric sensors to bridge the performers' real bodies to their Second Life avatars and Slapshock (more information, photos, video), in which medical TENS units are used to explore intersubjective symbiosis in intimate relationships.

== Growth ==
The demand for biomechatronic devicesare at an all-time high With increasing technological advancement in recent years, biomechatronic researchers have been able to construct prosthetic limbs that are capable of replicating the functionality of human appendages. Such devices include the "i-limb", developed by prosthetic company Touch Bionics, the first fully functioning prosthetic hand with articulating joints, as well as Herr's PowerFoot BiOM, the first prosthetic leg capable of simulating muscle and tendon processes within the human body. Biomechatronic research has also helped further research towards understanding human functions. Researchers from Carnegie Mellon and North Carolina State have created an exoskeleton that decreases the metabolic cost of walking by around 7 percent.

Many biomechatronic researchers are closely collaborating with military organizations. The US Department of Veterans Affairs and the Department of Defense are giving funds to different labs to help soldiers and war veterans.

Despite the demand, however, biomechatronic technologies struggle within the healthcare market due to high costs and lack of implementation into insurance policies. Herr claims that Medicare and Medicaid specifically are important "market-breakers or market-makers for all these technologies," and that the technologies will not be available to everyone until the technologies get a breakthrough. Biomechatronic devices, although improved, also still face mechanical obstructions, suffering from inadequate battery power, consistent mechanical reliability, and neural connections between prosthetics and the human body.

== See also ==
- Artificial cardiac pacemaker
- Artificial muscle
- Biomechanics
- Biomedical engineering
- Biometrics
- Bionics
- Brain–computer interface
- Cybernetics
- Cyberware
- Gerontechnology
- Mechatronics
- Neural engineering
- Neuroprosthetics
- Orthotics
- Prosthetics
