= Backward masking =

Aspect of human perception

In psychology and neuroscience, backward masking is a phenomenon of human perception in which a briefly presented stimulus (the "target") becomes difficult or impossible to consciously perceive when it is quickly followed by another stimulus (the "mask"). This usually occurs when the two stimuli are separated by only a very short time interval, often just a few milliseconds, highlighting the importance of timing in visual perception.

Even when people report that they did not see the target, it can still influence their behaviour. This suggests that the brain can process visual information without conscious awareness. As a result, backward masking is widely used in psychology and neuroscience to study how perception relates to consciousness.

== History ==
Backward masking was first studied in psychoacoustics, where later sounds can make earlier sounds harder to hear. The idea was later applied to vision. In visual backward masking, the second image interferes with the processing of the first, reducing the chance that it will be consciously noticed.

Researchers typically study this effect in laboratory experiments. In a standard task, a target image is shown very briefly, followed by a masking image. Participants are then asked to report what they saw.

Performance depends mainly on the timing between the two images, known as the stimulus onset asynchrony (SOA). When this interval is very short, people often fail to identify the target accurately. As the delay increases, their performance improves.

A related effect, known as forward masking, occurs when the mask appears before the target, although backward masking is generally more effective at disrupting conscious perception.

== Empirical findings ==
Research has consistently shown that visual perception unfolds over time. When the mask appears too quickly after the target, the brain may not have sufficient time to fully process the first image.

However, the target is not simply ignored. Studies have shown that masked stimuli can still influence behaviour. For example, they can affect how quickly people respond to later stimuli, even if they are not aware of seeing the original image. This is known as response priming.

Backward masking has also been used to study emotional processing. For instance, briefly presented emotional stimuli can influence physiological responses, such as attention or arousal, even when individuals are not consciously aware of them.

== Stages of processing ==
Research suggests that the brain processes visual information in stages. Early stages involve basic features such as shape and colour, while later stages combine this information into a meaningful percept.

Brain imaging studies show that masked images can still activate early visual areas. However, they often fail to reach later stages required for conscious awareness. This has led to the idea that awareness depends on signals becoming strong enough to spread across different areas of the brain.

More recent research has continued to explore how quickly these processes occur, suggesting that early brain responses can take place even without conscious awareness.

== Explanatory frameworks ==
Several explanations have been proposed for backward masking. One focuses on how signals travel through the brain. According to the dual-channel interaction theory, visual information moves along both fast and slow pathways. The mask may be processed more quickly and override the slower signal from the target, preventing it from reaching awareness.

Another explanation suggests that the mask interrupts processing of the target before it is complete. Since perception takes time to build up, introducing a second stimulus too quickly can disrupt this process.

While these explanations are often presented separately, they are not necessarily competing. Instead, backward masking is increasingly understood as the result of multiple interacting processes, including both early sensory dynamics and later cognitive factors such as attention and task demands.

These accounts can be understood in terms of different levels of explanation. Proximate explanations focus on the immediate mechanisms that produce backward masking, such as the timing and interaction of neural signals. In contrast, ultimate explanations consider why the perceptual system may prioritise recent information, for example to support rapid responses in changing environments. This distinction reflects a broader approach in psychology, where behaviour can be explained at different levels rather than through a single mechanism.

== Applications and limitations ==
Backward masking is widely used to study perception, attention, and consciousness. It is also used to explore whether people can be influenced by information they are not aware of seeing.

However, research suggests that these effects are typically small. Studies have found that the influence of masked stimuli on behaviour tends to be limited and can vary depending on the task.

There is also ongoing debate about how consistent the effect is. Some studies show strong masking effects, while others find weaker or less reliable results. Factors such as attention, task difficulty, and individual differences may all influence outcomes.

Finally, most studies are carried out in controlled laboratory settings, which may not fully reflect how perception works in everyday life. For this reason, backward masking is often considered a useful experimental tool in controlled settings, but not a complete model of real-world perception.
