= Gerontechnology =

Academic and professional field

Gerontechnology, also called gerotechnology is an inter- and multidisciplinary academic as well as a professional field that combines various disciplines of gerontology and technology. Sustainability of an aging society depends on our effectiveness in creating technological environments, including assistive technology and inclusive design, for innovative and independent living and social participation of older adults in any state of health, comfort as well as safety. In short, gerontechnology concerns matching technological environments to health, housing, mobility, communication, leisure, work and also the personality/individual dispositions of older people. Gerontechnology is most frequently identified as a subset of HealthTech and is—since the 2010s—more commonly referred to as AgeTech or Agetech in Europe and the United States. Research outcomes form the basis for designers, builders, engineers, manufacturers, and those in the health professions (nursing, medicine, gerontology, geriatrics, environmental psychology, developmental psychology, etc.), to provide an optimum living environment for the widest range of ages.

== Description ==
Gerontechnology is considered an adjunct to the promotion of human health and physical as well as emotional well-being. It pertains to both human development and aging with the aim to compress morbidity and to increase vitality and quality of life throughout the lifespan. It creates solutions to extend the working phase in society by maximizing the vital and productive years in the later years of life, which consequently reduces the cost of care.

The overall framework of gerontechnology may be seen as a matrix of domains of human activity: (1) health & self-esteem, housing & activities of daily living, communication & governance, mobility & transport, work & leisure, as well as (2) technology interventions or impact levels (enhancement & satisfaction, prevention & engagement, compensation & assistance, care and care organisation). Underpinning all these elements are generic and applied evidence-based research findings that aid in the development of products and services.

Gerontechnology has much in common with other interdisciplinary domains, such as Assistive Technology (for the compensation & assistance and the care support & care organisation rows of the matrix), Everybodytech, Technology for All (for example Technology 4 All.org) and Universal Design for the development of all products and services pertaining to gerontechnology.

== Gerontological design ==
Gerontological design focuses on providing effective solutions to improve the way of life for aging people, through gerontological knowledge and design research methods to obtain a better understanding of individuals' preferences and requirements.

Gerontological design also refers specifically to the study and practice of building design methods that support older users in the built environment. Some universities host professors, commonly in architecture or interior design departments, that specialize in the study and teaching of this design specialization. Not only does this include the examination of building design characteristics that impact older adults' physiological well-being, but it can also include the investigation of building design characteristics that impact informational needs (i.e. finding one's way around in a space) or social interaction needs (Campbell, 2012).

Between 2008 and 2030, Singapore will witness a shift in its population's age profile. In 2005, one in 12 residents was 65 years or older. By 2030, one in five residents will be 65 years or older. Studies show that in 2002, 7% of the world's population was aged 65 and above. By 2050, it is envisaged that the percentage could rise to nearly 17%. The ageing population and its impact on economics, politics, education and lifestyle is no longer an isolated issue but a global concern. Products and services relevant to the "silver industry" or the "mature market" increasingly abound in the marketplace. The demand for designers with a keen sense for the aging population's needs who employ gerontological design process knowledge concomitantly rises.

== Creativity in Gerontechnology ==
Creativity in gerontechnology focuses on integrating arts, design, and other artistic practices into technological interventions, with the goal of enhancing the quality of life for older adults. Researchers in this field aim to support cognitive health, emotional health, and social engagement within these aging populations.

A 2023 study reviewed digital creative art inventions (DCAIs), which include online music, dance, and visual arts programs given through apps or video calls. The review identified multiple health benefits for older adults. Physiologically, DCAIs supported fine motor skills and overall physical engagement. Psychologically, they helped reduce loneliness, anxiety, and depression by acting as a form of mental health support. Socially, DCAIs promoted connections with peers and communities through digital platforms. Cognitively they stimulated memory, creativity and problem solving abilities. Older adults generally found DCAIs feasible and enjoyable. However, there were also barriers found in these technologies, specifically around the complex interfaces, and age related issues like vision, hearing, and impairments to mobility. The study overall found that DCAIs were not just good for recreational use, but they also served as an important tool within gerontechnology, supporting successful aging by enhancing physical, cognitive, psychological, and social well being.

Another review conducted reviewed technology assisted creative arts activities for older adults living with mild cognitive impairment or dementia. The review saw various different health benefits. They engaged participants in music making, storytelling, and visual arts activities, again supporting fine motor skills and overall physical engagement. Participants in this showed improvements in memory recall, attention and engagement during and after the activities. While these were not large or permanent gains, the interventions appeared to help maintain cognitive functions while also stimulating mental activity. They also provided the older adults with enjoyment and emotional stimulation, reducing anxiety. Socially speaking, the activities facilitated engagement with peers and caregivers. The technology in this study was custom made and in the prototyping stage, but it highlighted the importance of designing technologies for older adults to ensure usability for creative works. It concluded that technology assisted creative arts are not just recreational but also serve as valuable components of gerontechnology, promoting successful aging.

The future of designing gerontechnology for creative pursuits is centered on user centered design, particularly through design approaches that involve older adults in the development process of these technologies. A study by Zhao et al. showed that older adults value simplicity, positivity, and pro activity in these technologies. These adults wanted technologies that would allow them to do creative pursuits within the comfort and ease of their own homes. This shows the shift towards home based, personalized creative tools. Along with this, new technology that is being studied like virtual reality (VR), augmented reality (AR) and artificial intelligence (AI) could also help with creative engagement for older generations. All of these new technologies could come together to give the older generations immersive experiences and adaptive interfaces that can cater to more specific needs and preferences. For example, VR would allow for virtual art studios for hobbies like sculpture and painting, while AI can help with music composition and even storytelling. This would make creative activities both more accessible and engaging. Furthermore, this study spoke on the integration of social elements into creative gerontechnologies. Adults have spoken on their desires for platforms that would allow for social interaction as well as community building within creative pursuits. Designing these types of technologies would not just benefit individual creativity, but it could also create connections between adults. This would benefit the well being of older generations, as well as combating isolation to create a sense of belonging.

The future of gerontechnology in creative pursuits is centered around developing platforms that are both inclusive and accessible. These platforms would empower older adults with the ability to continue creative ventures. With user centered design, specifically feedback from older generations, designers can create solutions for older generations with VR, AR, and AI. Doing so would result in improved cognitive, social, and emotional well being.

== Publications ==
An international academic journal with delayed open-access, Gerontechnology , is published by the International Society for Gerontechnology (ISG) .

A comprehensive volume titled Gerontechnology edited by Sunkyo Kwon has been published in 2016/2017.

== Applications ==
Age technology (AgeTech/Agetech) has been used to enhance aspects of insurance, domiciliary care, residential and nursing homes, health care, and risk management. The services may originate from various independent service providers or the interconnection of devices and services enabled through open APIs. Commercial businesses with an ageing component including the opportunities around the “Silver Economy” – providing services for the ‘wants’ of the older demographic, supporting independent living – addressing the ‘needs’ of the older demographic, longevity – extending healthy lifespan and geroscience.

== Education ==

The first ISG Masterclass for PhD students in 2006 produced a scheme to support gerontechnological research.

== See also ==
- Gero-Informatics
- Gerontology
- Biomechatronics
