= Specious present =

Perception of time

The specious present is defined as the "supposed time between past and future" or "a present that lasts a short stretch of physical time". The term was coined by E. R. Clay in his 1882 book The Alternative: A Study in Psychology, and cited by William James in The Principles of Psychology. It can be classed as a "thick" conception of time perception, to be contrasted with "thin" conceptions that see the present as instantaneous.

== Description ==
Clay (a pseudonym for E. Robert Kelly) wrote in The Alternative: A Study in Psychology (1882):

The relation of experience to time has not been profoundly studied. Its objects are given as being of the present, but the part of time referred to by the datum is a very different thing from the conterminous of the past and future which philosophy denotes by the name Present. The present to which the datum refers is really a part of the past — a recent past — delusively given as being a time that intervenes between the past and the future. Let it be named the specious present, and let the past that is given as being the past be known as the obvious past. All the notes of a bar of a song seem to the listener to be contained in the present. All the changes of place of a meteor seem to the beholder to be contained in the present. At the instant of the termination of such series no part of the time measured by them seems to be a past. Time, then, considered relatively to human apprehension, consists of four parts, viz. the obvious past, the specious present, the real present, and the future.

The concept was developed by philosopher William James. In his 1886 article "The Perception of Time", he wrote that "the prototype of all conceived times is the specious present, the short duration of which we are immediately and incessantly sensible". In The Principles of Psychology (1890) James includes the Clay quote above, adding, "In short, the practically cognized present is no knife-edge, but a saddle-back, with a certain breadth of its own on which we sit perched, and from which we look in two directions into time. The unit of composition of our perception of time is a duration, with a bow and a stern, as it were—a rearward- and a forward-looking end."

C. D. Broad further elaborated on the concept in Scientific Thought (1923), writing, "Every place to which an observer's body can go is a possible Here. In the same way every event either is, has been or will be Now, on the ordinary view, provided it be short enough to fall into what psychologists call a Specious Present."

The "specious present" has been a subject of discussion in many books and articles about the perception of time, and raises many issues in philosophy and psychology.
