= Psychological refractory period =

Time of slowed response to a second stimulus

The term psychological refractory period (PRP) refers to the period of time during which the response to a second stimulus is significantly slowed because a first stimulus is still being processed. This delay in response time when one is required to divide attention is of both practical and theoretical importance. The PRP can be used to investigate many questions about divided attention, examining tasks such as reading aloud, language, or driving and talking on the phone. PRP effects related to personality, age, and level of alcohol or caffeine intake have also been investigated.

== Methods ==
PRP is a product of the psychological refractory period paradigm, a paradigm in which two different stimuli are presented in rapid succession, each requiring a fast response. Stimulus onset asynchrony, the time that lapses between the presentations of the two stimuli, acts as the independent variable in this paradigm, and the reaction time to the second stimulus acts as the dependent variable.

Figure 1. Model of the central bottleneck accounting for the psychological refractory period. Execution of one task requires three stages: Stage 1 entails the analysis of the perceptual characteristics of the stimulus, Stage 2 entails a decision about what the task-set requires, Stage 3 is the execution of the actual response. Shaded stages cannot overlap, but if they do, for example when the time intervening between the two tasks (SOA) is short, the one that has priority (i.e., the first task) will delay (SLACK) the execution of the second. This phenomenon is known as the psychological refractory period.

An example of a PRP paradigm might be that there is a task 1 which requires participants to push the keyboard-letter 'n' with the right index finger when a square frame was green. There is also a task 2 which requires participants to push the keyboard-letter 'v' with the left index finger when the digit displayed was a '3' and to push the letter 'c' with the left middle finger if the digit displayed was a '4'. If the temporal distance between the two tasks is varied, for example 150 ms in one and 1000ms in another, the time to respond to the second task will be longer when the interval occurring between the two tasks is 150 ms than when it is 1000 ms. Referring to figure 1, the SLACK intervening between the execution of the first and second task will be absorbed when the interval intervening between the two tasks is long rather than when it is short.

== Results ==
Researchers have used the PRP paradigm design to study a wide variety of different topics in psychology.

=== Personality ===
PRP is not dependent on personality. Upon experimentation, participants were tested with a PRP paradigm in which the first task was an auditory task and the second task was a visual two choice task. Results indicated that there is an overall decrease in reaction time, exhibiting a psychological refractory period effect, however, there was no effect due to varying levels of extroversion and introversion.

=== Language ===
PRP studies have challenged the notion that central attention does not play a role in reading aloud. Upon experimentation, participants were primed with exception words (pin, mint, hint, lint) and pseudohomophones (brain and brane). In the PRP paradigm they were first asked to read the words aloud quickly, and then asked to respond to a tone by responding to the letter string (counterbalance order of words). Results indicated that the phonological process of reading aloud is not automatic it utilizes central attention, because reading aloud also exhibits a PRP effect. It was also determined that other language areas other than reading aloud are affected by PRP. Grammar whether it be open words such as nouns, or closed words such as determiners, pronoun, prepositions, conjunctions etc. require central attention.

=== Driving ===
The PRP affects not only simple dual tasks such as the way we read or speak, it also can affect more complicated tasks such as driving. Hal Pashler and his colleagues tested subjects in a driving simulation, and as they drove they would occasionally hear a tone. Once they heard the tone, they had to call out the number of the tone. The car in front of them would occasionally brake, causing the participant to brake. The results indicated that when they had to respond to a tone, they took longer to brake, which could potentially translate into a longer distance needed to slow driving or potential collisions.

=== Alcohol and caffeine ===
Alcohol impairs both speed and accuracy performance in PRP tasks, and while caffeine can reduce speed impairments, accuracy remains poor. Participants in this study performed a PRP task that measured dual-task interference. Performance was tested under 2 active doses and 1 placebo dose of caffeine in combination with 1 active dose and 1 placebo dose of alcohol. Results indicated that alcohol impaired PRP performance for both speed and accuracy, and the combination of caffeine and alcohol impaired PRP performance for accuracy but not speed. Therefore, although caffeine may counterbalance alcohol in terms of reaction time, it fails to counterbalance in terms of accuracy.

=== Aging ===
PRP becomes more apparent as we age. However, studies have aimed to determine if dual-task practice can help remove elderly disadvantages. It was previously determined from experimentation with young adults that practice reduces reaction time in both simple and PRP conditions; however, after consecutive days the PRP effect was still found to be evident, and therefore was still a function of stimulus onset asynchrony. However, this finding was further tested with older adults. Young and old participants were assigned to practice 7 blocks of PRP paradigm design. The first task required a vocal response to an auditory stimulus, followed by a manual response to a visual stimulus second task. Results showed that practice did not reduce PRP differences between the old and young. They administered the experiment again with either a less complicated first task or less complicated second task. Results showed that previous practice helped reduce PRP only for older adults. Therefore, older adults have a difficult time switching from task 1 to task 2 that is most profound when either the first or second task is difficult.

These differences could be due to the fact that older adults have a reduced ability to bypass the central bottleneck, through task automatization. Older and younger participants first learned to perform an auditory vocal task. They then participated in a PRP paradigm, with a manual response to a visual stimulus, followed by a highly practiced auditory vocal task. Results indicated that there was a processing bottleneck in all but 1 of the older adults. Therefore, older adults either have the ability to use automatic-memory retrieval and bypass the bottleneck and it is just less likely to be used, or they have actual lost the ability entirely.

== Theories ==
During the psychological refractory period, a network of brain regions in both the back and front of the brain are activated. These areas are notable for processing visual information as well as cognitive and motor information respectively. This PRP effect is most likely to be evident when an individual is stressed or is experiencing exhaustion. The PRP is likely caused by a combination of two approaches; the bottleneck approach and the capacity approach. These concepts vary in specific mechanisms, however, they both propose an overall limit to the amount of mental activity in which we can engage in.

=== Metaphor of the bottleneck ===
The bottleneck mechanism occurs when the first stimulus is being processed, any other stimuli cannot be processed. The processing of the second stimulus is postponed which slows down reaction time. Neurons that take in information send this information to specific neural networks in different locations. However, when some specific information is sent in one direction, there is a slight delay before new sensory information can be sent to another direction. The bottleneck can be intuitively appreciated by attempting to perform two streams of tasks in parallel without assigning priority to either one.

=== Capacity view ===
The PRP can also be explained by the capacity view. Limited mental resources must be shared when doing two tasks at once. This lacks a bottleneck metaphor; tasks can be performed simultaneously as long as the common pool of resource from which both the tasks pull from is not emptied. The capacity could either be a unitary pool or divided into two pools of mental resources, separated according to input modality (auditory or visual), and response required (vocal or manual). Therefore, if two tasks are in separate modalities they should not interfere with each other. However, despite this separation, there is a maximum to the amount of capacity that can be devoted to them together. Although this idea enjoys some success, it is criticized because it fails to specifically define a mental resource. The definition tends to be circular in that limited resources define why an individual is not able to share two tasks, while the fact that individuals are not able to do two tasks at once is due to limited mental resources.
