= Stimulus onset asynchrony =

Measure used in experimental psychology

Stimulus-onset asynchrony (SOA) is a measure used in experimental psychology. SOA denotes the amount of time between the start of one stimulus, S1, and the start of another stimulus, S2 (Figure 1). In this respect, a stimulus may consist of, e.g., a presented image, sound or printed word. A short time interval between S1 and S2 may lead to interference in the neural processing of these two patterns. Conversely, a very long SOA may lead to a situation where the brain activity caused by S1 may have faded, such that S2 has become an isolated event. Typical research questions concern the facilitation, deterioration, or biasing effects of the sequential stimulus presentation on a required later response. In one type of study on subliminal stimulation, called "pattern masking," subliminality is achieved by masking the subliminal stimulus with a second stimulus composed of either random parts of letters or numbers, or containing different kinds of figural properties. Here, the critical parameter is the time interval (the SOA) between the onset of the subliminal stimulus and the onset of the masking stimulus. In psycholinguistics the stimuli are typically a prime and a target, in which case the stimulus-onset asynchrony is measured from the beginning of the prime (S1) until the beginning of the target (S2). This time can be manipulated experimentally to determine its effects on other dependent measures such as reaction time or brain activity.

For an example of the application of stimulus-onset asynchrony, see psychological refractory period.

Figure 1. Time diagram for a trial in a psychological experiment. The stimulus-onset asynchrony (SOA) between the first presented pattern (S1) and the second stimulus (S2) is manipulated in order to measure an effect on reaction time (RT). Usually also the correctness of the response is studied.
