= Attentional blink =

Psychological effect

Attentional blink (AB) is a psychological effect where people struggle to notice a second visual target in a rapid sequence if it appears 200 to 500 milliseconds after the first and is followed by distractions. For instance, in a fast stream of letters like "B, X, C, K," if "X" and "K" are targets to spot, "K" is often missed if a letter like "C" comes between them.

The AB is typically measured by using rapid serial visual presentation (RSVP) tasks (tasks where items flash quickly one after another), where participants often fail to detect a second salient target if it is presented within the blink. The AB has also been observed using two backward-masked targets and auditory stimuli. The term attentional blink was first used in 1992, although the phenomenon was probably known before.

== Research ==
The precise adaptive significance behind the attentional blink is unknown, but it is thought to be a product of a two-stage visual processing system attempting to allocate episodic context to targets. In this system, all stimuli are processed to some extent by an initial parallel stage, and only salient ones are selected for in-depth processing, in order to make optimum use of limited resources at a late serial stage.

One interesting feature of the attentional blink is "lag-1 sparing." When two targets appear back-to-back—meaning the second follows the first with no items in between (at "lag 1" or consecutively) in a rapid stream (RSVP)—they avoid the attentional blink's effect. For example, in a fast sequence of letters like "T, X, P, Q," if "X" and "P" are the targets to spot, people usually notice both because they are consecutive. However, if the second target comes later (at greater lags), with distractions between them, it is much harder to notice—such as in "T, X, A, P," where "A" disrupts spotting "P." This sparing can extend to several targets if no non-target items interrupt them in the stream. Theories suggest this happens because attention shuts off (is suppressed) when a non-target item is spotted, allowing consecutive targets to slip through before the shut-off begins.

According to the LC-NE hypothesis, when a salient, or meaningful stimulus is presented, neurons in the locus coeruleus release norepinephrine, a neurotransmitter that benefits the detection of the stimulus. The effect of this release lasts for 100 ms after the salient stimulus is presented and benefits the second target when presented immediately after the first one, accounting for lag 1 sparing. Eventually the neurons in the locus coeruleus enter a refractory period, due to the auto-inhibitory effect of norepinephrine. According to the hypothesis, targets presented during this refractory period cannot trigger a release of norepinephrine, resulting in the attentional blink. The episodic distinctiveness hypothesis of the ST2 model suggests that the attentional blink reflects a limitation of the visual system attempting to allocate unique episodic contexts to the ephemeral target stimuli presented in RSVP.

The attentional blink is sometimes used to measure differences in attention between particular populations or experimental conditions

== Emotion ==
One factor which influences the AB is emotional information. When the second target (T2) in an RSVP stream is an emotionally relevant stimulus it is more likely to be perceived during the period during which the AB typically occurs. The AB is not only modulated by emotional relevance of (T2) but also by the emotional relevance of (T1). When (T1) is emotionally relevant the AB is lengthened and when (T2) is emotionally relevant, the AB is reduced. This suggests that emotion can mediate attention.

== Theories ==
=== The Inhibition Theory ===
Raymond et al. (1992) suggest that the attentional blink is produced by perceptual uncertainty amongst the target (T1) and following target (T2). They suggest that this confusion happens at some point in the target identification processes. When confusion is eliminated, attentional blink isn't observed. The researchers also suggested that one way to eliminate confusion is to have items that cannot be named.

=== The Interference Theory ===
Shapiro et al. (1994) suggest that an interference model may better explain the attentional blink effects than the inhibition model. In this model, the attentional blink is thought to take place because of an out of place item which is selected out of the series because of the interference within the items in the series. Shapiro proposes that the amount of interference increases or decreases with the length of the series.

=== The Delay of Processing Theory ===
Giesbrecht and Di Lollo (1998) suggest that the attentional blink over target 2 results when the person is busy processing target 1. It is suggested that anything increasing the difficulty of processing of the first target will result in a greater attentional blink.

=== The Attentional Capacity Theory ===
Duncan et al. (1996) suggest that the target 1 takes over parts of our attentional capacity, leading to a deficit of processing or recognizing target 2 when presented immediately after target 1. This theory suggests that the time for which target 2 continues to occupy attentional capacity is related directly to the difficulty of processing target 1.

=== The Two-Stage Processing Theory ===
Chun & Potter (1995) suggest that quickly processing a series of items requires two back to back stages. The first stage is the initial rapid-detection. Here, the possible targets are noticed. The second stage is the capacity-limited in which items are taken in order to report later. Stage 2 occurs after the acknowledgement of targets in Stage 1. Here, stage 2 must finishing processing target 1, until then, target 2 will not be recognized in stage 2. If there is a situation where the second target comes in the first stage, the highway to stage two is delayed. Attentional blinking occurs when target 2 is in stage 1 but target 1 is still in stage 2 so target 2 can not get to stage 2. The attentional blink mirror a restriction in the process of combining information from an unstable representation to a stable representation (Johnson & Proctor, 2004).

== See also ==
- Visual masking
