= List of blindness effects =

There are several psychological and physiological effects that cause blindness to some visual stimulus.

- Banner blindness or ad blindness, consciously or subconsciously ignoring banner-like advertisements at web pages.
- Change blindness, the inability to detect some changes in busy scenes.
- Choice blindness, a result in a perception experiment by Petter Johansson and colleagues.
- Color blindness, a color vision deficiency.
- Cortical blindness, a loss of vision caused by damage to the visual area in the brain.
- Flash blindness, a visual impairment following exposure to a light flash.
- Hysterical blindness (nowadays known as conversion disorder), the appearance of neurological symptoms without a neurological cause.
- Inattentional blindness or perceptual blindness, failing to notice some stimulus that is in plain sight.
- Motion blindness, a neuropsychological disorder causing an inability to perceive motion.

== See also ==
- Blindness (disambiguation)
