= The Invisible Gorilla =

2010 book by Christopher Chabris & Daniel Simons

- First edition cover
- Author: Christopher Chabris, Daniel Simons
- Language: English
- Genre: Psychology
- Publisher: Crown
- Publication date: 2010
- ISBN: 9780307459657

The Invisible Gorilla is a non-fiction book published in 2010, co-authored by Christopher Chabris and Daniel Simons. The title of this book refers to an earlier research project by Chabris and Simons revealing that people who are focused on something can easily overlook something else.

To demonstrate this effect, they created a video of students passing a basketball between themselves. Viewers asked to count the number of times the players with the white shirts pass the ball often fail to notice a person in a gorilla suit who appears in the center of the image (see Invisible Gorilla Test), an experiment described as "one of the most famous psychological demos ever". Simons and Chabris were awarded an Ig Nobel Prize for the Invisible Gorilla experiment.

== See also ==
- Attention
- Attentional control
- Change blindness
- Inattentional blindness
- Invisible ships
