= Invisible ships =

Myth

The invisible ships (or ships not seen) myth claims that when European explorers' ships approached either North America, South America, or Australia, the appearance of their large ships was so foreign to the native people that they could not even see the vessels in front of them. It is likely based on a passage of Joseph Banks' diary describing HMS Endeavour's arrival in Botany Bay. Banks wrote that the natives did not appear surprised or concerned from a distance, but unlike the myth, once the ships approached land they were confronted by armed men. Though the common versions of the myth are apocryphal and not based in science, it has been promoted by New Age personalities, prominently in the 2004 film What the Bleep Do We Know!?

== Variations ==
There are several apocryphal variations on the myth, all of which involve native people being unable to see ships approaching due to perceptual blindness. In some versions, the explorer is not Captain Cook but Ferdinand Magellan or Christopher Columbus, or the land is the coast of North or South America.

The story has come to be associated with New Age works. A prominent example is the 2004 film What the Bleep Do We Know!?, created by the New Age sect Ramtha's School of Enlightenment. During a discussion in the film of the influence of experience on perception, neuroscientist Candace Pert relays a version of the myth whereby Native Americans were unable to see Columbus's ships because they were outside the natives' experience. The movie goes on to add a shaman to the narrative, who began to see ripples in the water and eventually could see the ship. Once the shaman started to tell people about them, others began to be able to see as well.

== Historical basis ==
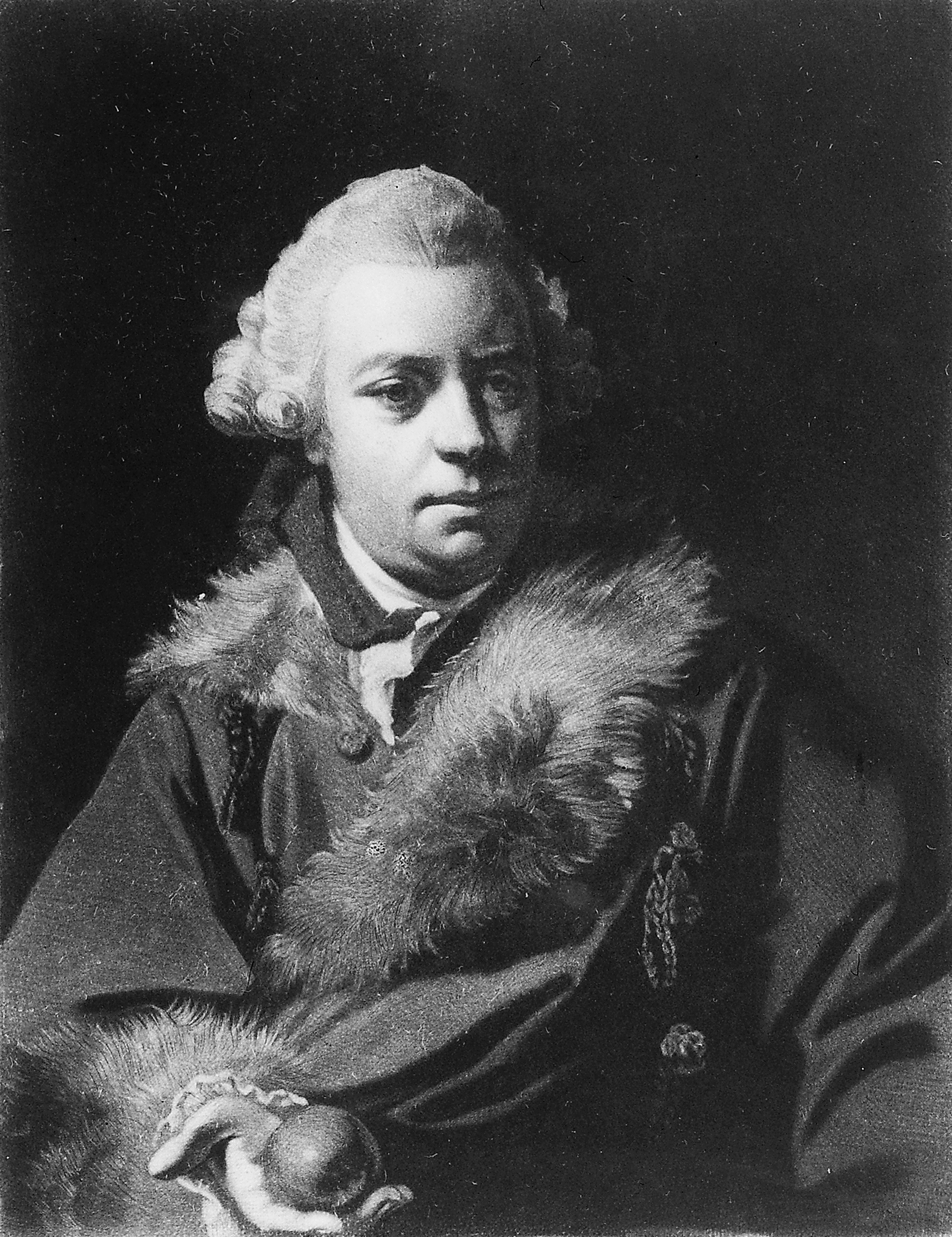
Joseph Banks' account of HMS Endeavour's entry into Botany Bay may be the basis for the myth.

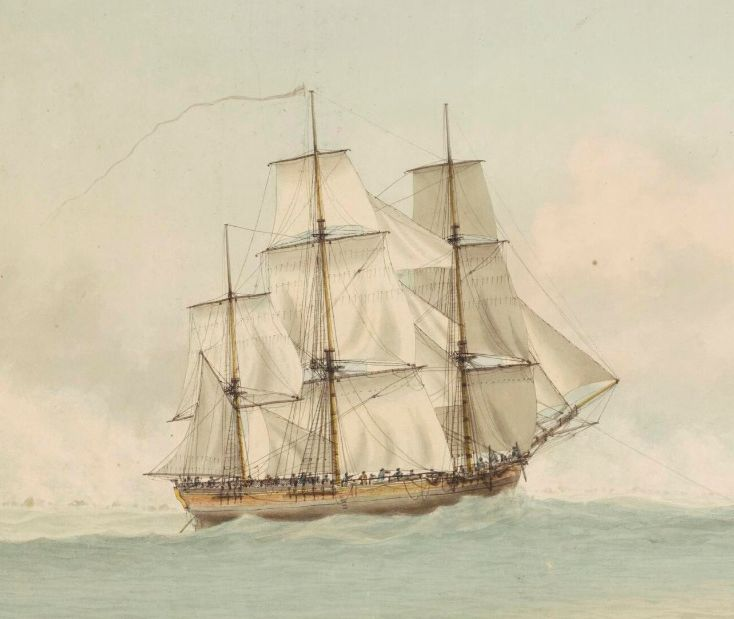
Painting of the grounding of the Endeavour on Australia's Great Barrier Reef in June 1770

The invisible ships myth is likely based on the diary of botanist Joseph Banks, who traveled with Captain Cook on HMS Endeavour and documented his account of the natives when entering Botany Bay in Australia in April 1770:

These people seemd to be totaly engag'd in what they were about: the ship passed within a quarter of a mile of them and yet they scarce lifted their eyes from their employment; I was almost inclind to think that attentive to their business and deafnd by the noise of the surf they neither saw nor heard her go past them. At 1 we came to an anchor abreast of a small village consisting of about 6 or 8 houses. Soon after this an old woman followed by three children came out of the wood; she carried several peices [sic] of stick and the children also had their little burthens; when she came to the houses 3 more younger children came out of one of them to meet her. She often lookd at the ship but expressd neither surprise nor concern. Soon after this she lighted a fire and the four Canoes came in from fishing; the people landed, hauld up their boats and began to dress their dinner to all appearance totaly unmovd at us, tho we were within a little more than 1/2 a mile of them.

Banks goes on to say that while he was surprised the 106-foot ship did not receive more attention from a distance, when they came a bit closer they were confronted by armed men. This passage is also preceded by his observation that ten people had gone up to a hill to see the ship. Contrary to the myth, there was no reason to think natives did not see the ship apart from Banks' surprise at their reception from afar.

== Explanation ==
According to various versions of the myth, Native Americans or Australians could not see the ships because they did not have a concept for such an object or because they did not fit into their experience. The large sailing ships did not resemble the smaller canoe-like ships that were more familiar. Philosopher J. R. Hustwit wrote that if these premises of the myth were true, "that unfamiliar objects are coated in some sort of cognitive Teflon ... learning would not be possible".

In the case of Banks and other versions of the myth, the natives' inability to see the ships is not based on native people describing their perception but on the perception of the explorers who expected a different reception. Bernie Hobbs of ABC Science, writing about the version in What the Bleep Do We Know!?, points out there is no known historical documentation of the Native Americans' perspective, that Native Americans at the time did not have a written language to document the event, and Columbus did not know the language even if the myth did originate with him.

Barry Evans of North Coast Journal suggests the more likely explanation is that "anything that wasn't a threat or didn't contribute to their well-being could be safely ignored" and that when it was perceived as a threat, they engaged directly. Hobbs of ABC Science likens the natives' likely experience to the inattentional blindness and selective attention demonstrated by the Invisible Gorilla Test produced by Christopher Chabris and Daniel Simons. The test takes the form of a video that includes several people passing a basketball back and forth while moving around the frame. The viewer is asked to count the number of times people wearing white shirts pass the ball. In the middle of the video a person in a gorilla suit walks from one side of the frame to the other, but many people who watch the video do not see the gorilla because they are focused on their task. Similarly, David Hambling wrote in Fortean Times that Europeans were "used to being the star attraction wherever they go", that it should not be surprising that they were perceived as hostile and so not warmly greeted, and that perhaps "the aborigines did not think that this outsize canoe was quite so 'remarkable' as Banks himself did".

According to an interviewee in a National Museum of Australia oral history project, the natives Banks wrote about may have ignored the explorers because "in Dharawal culture, contact with strangers or spirits from the afterlife caused spiritual consequences and was mostly avoided by the general community."
