= Cognitive capture =

Cognitive capture has alternative meanings in the social sciences. It is a type of:

- Inattentional blindness in the field of psychology.
- Regulatory capture in the field of economics.
- Cognitive Capture in the field of human-AI relations.
