= Temporary blindness =

Temporary blindness, a type of non-permanent vision loss, may refer to:

- Amaurosis fugax, or fleeting blindness
- Conversion disorder, formerly called hysterical blindness
- Flash blindness, caused by exposure to high-intensity light.

== See also ==
- Blindness (disambiguation)
