= Adaptive unconscious =

Psychological theory

The adaptive unconscious, first coined by social psychologist Daniel Wegner in 2002, is described as a set of mental processes that is able to affect judgement and decision-making, but is out of reach of the conscious mind. It is thought to be adaptive as it helps to keep the organism alive. Architecturally, the adaptive unconscious is said to be unreachable because it is buried in an unknown part of the brain. This type of thinking evolved earlier than the conscious mind, enabling the mind to transform information and think in ways that enhance an organism's survival. It can be described as a quick sizing up of the world which interprets information and decides how to act very quickly and outside the conscious view. The adaptive unconscious is active in everyday activities such as learning new material, detecting patterns, and filtering information. It is also characterized by being unconscious, unintentional, uncontrollable, and efficient without requiring cognitive tools. Lacking the need for cognitive tools does not make the adaptive unconscious any less useful than the conscious mind as the adaptive unconscious allows for processes like memory formation, physical balancing, language, learning, and some emotional and personalities processes that includes judgement, decision making, impression formation, evaluations, and goal pursuing. Despite being useful, the series of processes of the adaptive unconscious will not always result in accurate or correct decisions by the organism. The adaptive unconscious is affected by things like emotional reaction, estimations, and experience and is thus inclined to stereotyping and schema which can lead to inaccuracy in decision making. The adaptive conscious does however help decision making to eliminate cognitive biases such as prejudice because of its lack of cognitive tools.

== Overview ==
The adaptive unconscious is defined as different from conscious processing in a number of ways. It is faster, effortless, more focused on the present, and less flexible. It is thought to be adaptive as it helps to keep us alive. Processing information without us even realising then feeding any we do need to know to our conscious brain.

In other theories of the mind, the unconscious is limited to "low-level" activities, such as carrying out goals which have been decided consciously. In contrast, the adaptive unconscious is now thought to also be involved in "high-level" cognition such as goal-setting.

The theory of the adaptive unconscious was influenced by some of Sigmund Freud and Carl Jung's views on the unconscious mind. According to Freud, the unconscious mind stored a lot of mental content which needs to be repressed; however, the term adaptive unconscious reflects the idea that much of what the unconscious does is actually beneficial to the organism, in closer accordance with Jung's thought. For example, its various processes have been streamlined through evolution to quickly evaluate and respond to patterns in an organism's environment.

== Intuition ==
Canadian journalist and author Malcolm Gladwell described intuition, not as an emotional reaction, but a very quick thinking. He said that if an individual realized that a truck is about to hit him, there would be no time to think through all of his options and, to survive, he must rely on this kind of decision-making apparatus, which is capable of making very quick judgments based on little information. Gladwell also cited another example in the case of a kouros acquired by the J. Paul Getty Museum in Los Angeles. A team of scientists vouched for its authenticity but some historians, such as Thomas Hoving, instantly knew otherwise - that they felt an "intuitive repulsion" for the piece, which was eventually proved as fake.

Intuition comes from tapping into the adaptive unconscious. The adaptive unconscious is that liminal zone between dreams and reality, what might be called a reciprocal of experiences, memories, and dreams. Working within the adaptive unconscious involves browsing through a series of sense impressions and making comparisons regarding a situation and using past experiences to dissolve sensory boundaries which then results in intuition. There is also a study that cited intuition as a result of the way our brain stores, processes and uses the information of our subconscious. It becomes useful when reasoning and rationality provide no rapid answer.

== The introspection illusion ==
The debate over the existence of introspection began in the late 19th century with experiments involving placing people in different stimuli contexts and them thinking about their thoughts and feelings after. Similar experiments have continued since, all relying on asking the participant to think about how they feel and their thoughts. These research efforts have however been hampered by the fact it is currently impossible to know if they are actually accessing their unconscious as they do this, or if the information is just coming from their conscious mind. This fundamental flaw makes experiments in this area less reliable in creating the debate over introspection.

More recent research suggests that many of our preferences, attitudes, and ideas come from the adaptive unconscious. However, subjects themselves do not realize this, and they are "unaware of their own unawareness". People wrongly think they have direct insight into the origins of their mental states. A subject is likely to give explanations for their behavior (i.e. their preferences, attitudes, and ideas), but the subject tends to be inaccurate in this "insight." The false explanations of their own behavior is what psychologists call the introspection illusion.

In some experiments, subjects provide explanations that are fabricated, distorted, or misinterpreted memories, but not lies – a phenomenon called confabulation. This suggests that introspection is instead an indirect, unreliable process of inference. It has been argued that this "introspection illusion" underlies a number of perceived differences between the self and other people, because people trust these unreliable introspections when forming attitudes about themselves but not about others.

However, this theory of the limits of introspection has been highly controversial, and it has been difficult to test unambiguously how much information individuals get from introspection. The difficulties in understanding the introspective method resulted in a lack of theoretical development of the mind and more into behaviourism. The difficulties of finding a method that worked (i.e. not self-reporting by the patient) mean there was a halt in this area of research until the cognitive revolution. Due to this the need to understand the unconscious mind increased. Psychologists started to focus on the limits of the conscious mind and more stimuli and learning paradigm focused experiments for the unconscious mind. This helps understand the limitations of introspection or the lack of as some would argue.

== Implicit-explicit relationships ==
The theory of introspection is highly controversial. This is due to research showing inconsistencies between our introspective reports and factors affecting our stimuli. This issue lead to a new way to study introspective access by using the adaptive unconsciousness. This is done by looking at the implicit-explicit relationship, specifically the differences between the two. Explicit processes involve cognitive resources and are done with awareness. On the other hand, implicit processes require at least one of the following: lack of intention; lack of management; reduced awareness of where the responses came from; and finally, high efficiency of processing. This shows the differences that occur between the two processes and the contention around the differences as they cannot be pinned down to one specific thing. These differences between implicit and explicit factors is argued to be able to be used as evidence for introspection existence. If implicit processes become weaker than explicit processes then it can result in larger differences between the two. This results in consequences for future information processing and the well-being of the person. However, if this occurs in the right conditions it can allow for implicit processing output to enter the conscious mind. This leads to a small self-insight into the adaptive unconscious allowing us to understand it more.

Arguably, this argument of the independence of introspection existence based on the implicit-explicit relationship may actually be more conditional than originally thought. This view coincides with the idea that access to our unconsciousness is dependent on the competition between processes and their surrounding contexts. These contexts provide the association our stimuli have with certain aspects of society. For example, if you found pleasure in running, when running your cognitive processes either implicit or explicit would tell your unconscious you are feeling joy without you realising this was occurring. This could then be translated into the conscious mind.

== Adaptive unconscious versus conscious thinking ==
Many used to think most of our behaviours, thoughts, feelings all came from our conscious brain. However, as our understanding has grown it is obvious our adaptive unconscious does much more than we originally thought. Once we thought the creation of goals and self-reflection occurred consciously but now we realise its all in our unconscious. Our unconscious and conscious minds do have to work together though for us to continue efficiently functioning. We need to understand the dual system our brain uses between our adaptive unconscious and our conscious mind more. Analysing information, attitudes and feelings in the unconscious mind first which then contributes and creates our conscious versions of this. The debate is no longer whether the adaptive unconscious exists but more which is more important in our everyday decision making? The adaptive unconscious or the conscious mind. Some would say it is becoming more and more apparent that our unconscious seems to be much more important than we originally thought especially compared to our conscious brain. The low-level processing we used to think our adaptive unconscious did we now realise may actually be the job of our conscious mind. Our adaptive unconscious may actually be the power house in our brain making the important decisions and holding the important information. It does this all without us even realising.

== See also ==
- Autosuggestion – Psychological technique related to the placebo effect
- Blink: The Power of Thinking Without Thinking (book) – 2005 book by Malcolm Gladwell
- Cognitive module – Concept in cognitive psychology
- Ego depletion – Psychological theory
- Intuition (knowledge) – Ability to acquire knowledge without conscious reasoning
- Neuroscience of free will – Neurophilosophical study of topics related to free will
- Subconscious – Part of the mind that is not currently of focal awareness
- Unconscious mind – Mental processes not available to introspection

== Sources ==
- Wilson, Timothy D. (2002). Strangers to Ourselves: Discovering the Adaptive Unconscious. Belknap Press of Harvard University Press. ISBN 978-0-674-01382-7.
- Bargh, John A.; Ezequiel Morsella (2008). "The Unconscious Mind". Perspectives on Psychological Science. 3 (1): 73–79. doi:10.1111/j.1745-6916.2008.00064.x. PMC 2440575. PMID 18584056.
