= Irvin Rock =

American experimental psychologist

Irvin Rock (1922–1995) was an American experimental psychologist who studied visual perception at the University of California at Berkeley. He wrote a book, titled The Logic of Perception, and was regarded as an excellent perception psychologist. Rock is notable in the field of psychology for his 1957 experiment where he tilted a square to make it look like a diamond and then tilted his test subjects and asked them what shape they saw. The experiment tested Rock's hypothesis that perceptual phenomena could be explained by higher-level mental processes instead of merely by automatic processes. When his test subjects continued to perceive the shape as a diamond after being tilted to view the shape as a square, Rock concluded that perception is an intelligent, higher-level mental process. This differed from previous conclusions by Gestalt psychologists that perception was not a higher-level process. Rock later wrote another important book on the field of inattentional blindness.

== Life ==
=== Education and career ===
Irvin Rock grew up in New York City where he received his bachelor's degree in psychology in 1947 and his master's degree in psychology in 1948, both at the City College of New York. He earned his Ph.D. while a student under Hans Wallach in 1952 from the New School for Social Research, now known as The New School. He became a professor there, and afterward at Yeshiva University. In 1967, he moved to the Rutgers-Newark campus and later to the Rutgers-New Brunswick campus at Rutgers University, where he continued to teach psychology until he retired from the university in 1987. Shortly after retiring from Rutgers, he moved to the University of California, Berkeley, where he worked as an adjunct professor of psychology until his death in June 1995.

In the 1990s at Berkeley, he conducted much research in the field of inattentional blindness, a term he coined with his co-researcher, Arien Mack. They published a seminal book called Inattentional Blindness in 1998.

=== Death ===
On July 18, 1995, Rock died from pancreatic cancer in his home, survived by his wife Sylvia, and five children: Peter, Alice, Lisa, and David Rock, and Rayna Shilling-McCallum.
