= Change deafness =

Perceptual phenomenon in hearing

Change deafness is a perceptual phenomenon that occurs when, under certain circumstances, a physical change in an auditory stimulus goes unnoticed by the listener. There is uncertainty regarding the mechanisms by which changes to auditory stimuli go undetected, though scientific research has been done to determine the levels of processing at which these consciously undetected auditory changes are actually encoded. An understanding of the mechanisms underlying change deafness could offer insight on issues such as the completeness of our representation of the auditory environment, the limitations of the auditory perceptual system, and the relationship between the auditory system and memory. The phenomenon of change deafness is thought to be related to the interactions between high and low level processes that produce conscious experiences of auditory soundscapes.

== Determinants ==
=== Attention ===
Evidence that attention influences change deafness has been observed across a variety of auditory paradigms, including those consisting of semantic language and natural sounds. In both cases, inattention to the relevant segment of the auditory scene results in more occurrences of change-deafness, where attention may be a function of structural components of the auditory information, or cues built into the experimental design.

==== Semantic evidence ====
In one study, participants listened to short narratives in which a man and woman converse about an inanimate object that is semantically related to the man (e.g., "tourist" and "suitcase"). In the fifth sentence of the narrative, either the woman would continue her conversation with the man (coherent continuation), or she would suddenly start talking to the inanimate object instead (anomalous continuation); except for the critical words, these continuations were identical in coherent and anomalous continuations. In both cases the critical words of the continuation were de-accented, in order to minimize prosodic differences across both versions of the story. It was predicted that listeners would immediately notice the semantic change in the anomalous continuation condition, despite conditions that have been demonstrated to elicit semantic illusions, since it produces a strong discourse coherence break. This was tested using event-related potential analysis, with the expectation that the anomalous continuation would immediately elicit a large N400 effect relative to the coherent continuation, given that semantically anomalous, or even coherent but unexpected words, have been shown to elicit significantly larger N400 effects than semantically coherent or expected words about 150–250 ms after the onset of the critical word. Contrary to this prediction, results yielded the absence of an N400 effect and the presence of a differential effect that began to emerge at approximately 500–600 ms after critical word onset. The absence of an N400 effect is interpreted as a temporary change deafness effect in which the semantic change momentarily went undetected, because of the well-established sensitivity of the N400 to very subtle differences in the relatedness of a word to its semantic context. The experimenters speculate that the initial lack of change detection is a product of strong expectations combined with input that is superficially consistent with the context, in that the anomalous word is semantically associated with the correct word and not accented in any unusual way. The differential event-related potential shows that the participants processed the change, but it took significantly longer to detect than expected.

==== Evidence from perception of natural sounds ====
Another study examined the effect of selective attention on the perception of changes to auditory scenes consisting of multiple naturalistic sounds, and found that auditory perception is limited by attention. In the task, listeners heard two versions of any auditory scene, with one object missing from the second version. Participants were either instructed to attend to a specific object, and report whether that object was missing in the second version of the scene, or to attend to all objects, and report whether any object was missing in the second scene; these are called the directed- and non-directed attention conditions respectively. Results showed that in the absence of an attentional cue, change-detection in auditory scenes consisting of more than about four objects is unreliable, where changes consist of either the disappearance of an object or a change in its location. There is ambiguity concerning the mechanism that produces the effect of attention on change-deafness, and this study suggests two possibilities. The first is that segregation of the distinct streams composing an auditory scene requires directed attention, meaning that the change-deafness effects observed in the study would reflect a difficulty in perceiving separate auditory scenes in the absence of attentional cues. A second alternative is that complex auditory scenes are initially perceived as consisting of separate streams, and thus change-deafness effects are the result of limits in encoding and storing multiple sets of auditory information for comparison with a subsequent scene.

=== Experience and familiarity: evidence from musical change deafness ===
A change detection task consisting of musical melodies of different types, namely stylistic melodies (following the normal constraints of Classical music), non-stylistic melodies (lacking in tonal structure), and randomly generated melodies, revealed significant effects of several interacting parameters on change-deafness. Tonal, rhythmic and metrical structure can give emphasis to a sequence of notes, giving listeners a template on which to build a "musical gist", or a memory representation for schematically consistent tones. This experiment produced evidence supporting the prediction that a lack of musical structure makes schematic processing of the auditory information more difficult, producing more change deafness among listeners. When the melodies presented in these experiments were structurally unfamiliar, the listeners had greater difficulty encoding features of the music and were thus less able to detect changes in melody. In this task, the listeners' experience and familiarity with Western music determined their ability to encode features of the music; however non-scale tones, as well as tones not emphasized by meter and duration, were not consistently retained in short-term memory, and thus listeners were less able to detect changes to these elements of the music.

== Neural correlates ==
One study used fMRI data to distinguish neural correlates of physical changes in auditory input (independent of conscious change detection), from those of conscious perception of change (independent of an actual physical change). The study made use of a change deafness paradigm in which participants were exposed to complex auditory scenes consisting of six individual auditory streams differing in pitch, rhythm, and sound source location, and received a cue indicating which stream to attend to. Each participant listened to two consecutively presented auditory scenes after which they were prompted to indicate whether both scenes were identical or not. Functional MRI results revealed that physical change in stimulus was correlated with increased BOLD responses in the right auditory cortex, near the lateral portion of Heschl's gyrus, the first cortical structure to process incoming auditory information, but not in hierarchically higher brain regions. Conscious change detection was correlated with increased coupled responses in the ACC and the right insula, consistent with additional evidence that the anterior insula functions to mediate dynamic interactions between other brain networks involved in attention to external stimuli, forming a salience network with the ACC that identifies salient stimulus events and initiates additional processing. In absence of change detection, this salience network was not activated; however increased activity in other cortical areas suggests that undetected changes are still perceived on some level, but fail to trigger conscious change detection, thus producing the change deafness phenomenon.

Additional studies of change deafness have generated evidence in support of the prediction that undetected changes are successfully encoded at the sensory level in the auditory cortex, but do not trigger later change-related cortical responses that would produce conscious perception of change. EEG analysis during a change-detection task using changes in pitch revealed that responses previously shown to be involved with sensory extraction of pitch information increased during both detected and undetected pitch changes in auditory input, however only in cases where the pitch change was detected were later processing stages triggered, originating from hierarchically higher non-sensory brain regions. These findings suggest that change deafness does not arise from a deficit in initial sensory encoding of changed stimulus features in auditory cortex but occurs at a higher level of stimulus processing in auditory cortex, resulting in a failure to trigger auditory change detection mechanisms.

== See also ==
- Auditory scene analysis
- Change blindness
- Cognitive inhibition
- Selective auditory attention
- Stimulus filtering
