= Emily Pronin =

American psychologist

- Born: New York City, New York
- Education: Stanford University; Yale University
- Known for: Introspection illusion Bias blind spot
- Spouse: Joshua Rabinowitz (m. 2008)
- Scientific career
- Fields: Self-perception theory Behavior genetics
- Workplaces: University of Princeton

Emily Pronin is an American psychologist who specializes in human self-perception and decision making. She is a professor of Psychology and Public affair at Princeton University. She created and coined the terms Bias blind spot and Introspection illusion.

== Biography ==
She was born in New York City to Irwin Pronin, a regulatory lawyer and Vivian Pronin an independent geriatric care manager. She received her BA from Yale University and her PhD from Stanford University.

== Research ==
In 2002, Pronin and her colleagues initially defined the Bias blind spot in 2002, which is the observation that people feel they are less biassed in their judgements and conduct than the overall population, i.e., they are "blind" to their own cognitive biases. While that discovery inspired a slew of subsequent studies, no one has attempted to exactly reproduce the original tests. In 2002, Pronin's research introduced "Naive Realism," highlighting how people tend to believe they have a more objective view of others while underestimating that others might see them more clearly. Pronin coined the term "introspection illusion" to describe the mistaken belief in own unbiased self-perception, she believes humans tend to think of themselves as more virtuous than they might be, while readily recognizing the faults in others.

In her research on free will Pronin explores how people perceive themselves versus others, her research shows that individuals often see their own judgments as rational and influenced by free will, while viewing others as predictable and less guided by free will.

== Selected publications ==
- Pronin, Emily; Lin, Daniel Y.; Ross, Lee (March 2002). "The Bias Blind Spot: Perceptions of Bias in Self Versus Others". Personality and Social Psychology Bulletin. 28 (3): 369–381. doi:10.1177/0146167202286008.
- Pronin, Emily; Olivola, Christopher Y.; Kennedy, Kathleen A. (February 2008). "Doing Unto Future Selves As You Would Do Unto Others: Psychological Distance and Decision Making". Personality and Social Psychology Bulletin. 34 (2): 224–236. doi:10.1177/0146167207310023. PMID 18156588.
- Kennedy, Kathleen A.; Pronin, Emily (June 2008). "When Disagreement Gets Ugly: Perceptions of Bias and the Escalation of Conflict". Personality and Social Psychology Bulletin. 34 (6): 833–848. doi:10.1177/0146167208315158. PMID 18469154.
- Pronin, Emily (2009). "Chapter 1 The Introspection Illusion". Advances in Experimental Social Psychology. 41: 1–67. doi:10.1016/S0065-2601(08)00401-2. ISBN 978-0-12-374472-2.
- Pronin, Emily; Chandler, Jesse J. (April 2012). "Fast Thought Speed Induces Risk Taking". Psychological Science. 23 (4): 370–374. doi:10.1177/0956797611431464. PMID 22395129.
- Pronin, Emily (August 2013). "When the Mind Races: Effects of Thought Speed on Feeling and Action". Current Directions in Psychological Science. 22 (4): 283–288. doi:10.1177/0963721413482324.
- Pronin, Emily; Gerbasi, Margaret; Todorov, Alexander; Kruse, Elliott; Hansen, Katherine (June 2014). "People Claim Objectivity After Knowingly Using Biased Strategies". Personality and Social Psychology Bulletin. 40 (6): 691–699. doi:10.1177/0146167214523476. PMID 24562289.
- Sekhsaria, Shriya; Pronin, Emily (August 2021). "Underappreciated Benefits of Reading Own and Others' Memories". Social Cognition. 39 (4): 504–525. doi:10.1521/soco.2021.39.4.504.
- Pronin, Emily; Hazel, Lori (October 2023). "Humans' Bias Blind Spot and Its Societal Significance". Current Directions in Psychological Science. 32 (5): 402–409. doi:10.1177/09637214231178745.
