= Christopher Chabris =

American psychologist (born 1966)

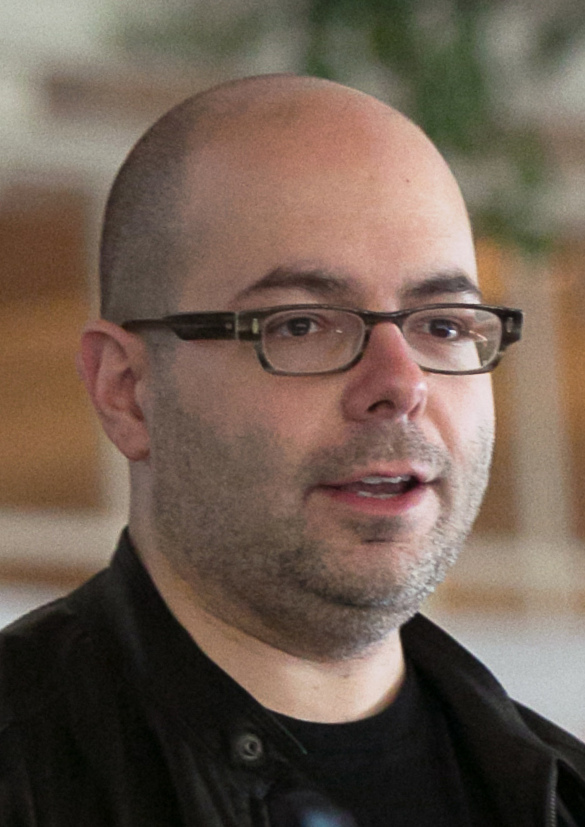
- Christopher Chabris speaking in 2012
- Born: November 19, 1966 (age 59)
- Education: Harvard University
- Known for: The Invisible Gorilla
- Scientific career
- Fields: Psychology, Experimental psychology, cognitive science, Cognitive Illusions

Christopher F. Chabris (/ʃəˈbriː/) is an American research psychologist, currently Senior Investigator (Professor) at Geisinger Health System, visiting fellow at the Institute for Advanced Study in Toulouse, France, and associate professor of Psychology and co-director of the Neuroscience Program at Union College in Schenectady, New York (on leave 2016–2017). He is best known as the co-author (with Daniel Simons) of the popular science book The Invisible Gorilla, which presents the results of research into attention and other cognitive illusions.

== Biography ==
Chabris was born in New York City in 1966, grew up in Westchester County and has lived in Massachusetts since graduating from college. He received his B.A. in computer science (1988) at Harvard University and was then Artificial Intelligence Program Manager in the Psychology Department for five years. In 1999 he received a Ph.D. degree in psychology from Harvard University, with a thesis titled "Cognitive and Neuropsychological Mechanisms of Expertise: Studies with Chess Masters." From 1999 to 2001 he was a Research Fellow at the NMR Center, Department of Radiology, Massachusetts General Hospital and Harvard Medical School. In Fall 2002 he was a Lecturer teaching an introductory course on cognitive neuroscience, and from 2001 to 2002 he was a Postdoctoral Fellow in the Harvard Psychology Department.

Chabris has been a chess master since 1986. He was a founder of the American Chess Journal and a former editor of the Massachusetts Chess Association (MACA) magazine Chess Horizons. He has produced several chess events and writes on monthly column called Game On for The Wall Street Journal.

== Research ==
Chabris' research focuses on attention, decision-making, collective intelligence, cognitive ability, and behavioral genetics. His recent work includes the genetic origin of intelligence, demonstrating that many genes formerly associated with intelligence are actually false positives. Chabris is also a regular media commentator on psychology-related topics such as the theory that 10,000 hours of practice make someone an expert, and that listening to Mozart makes you more intelligent.

== The Invisible Gorilla ==
Chabris is best known outside the academic community as the co-author with Daniel Simons of the book The Invisible Gorilla, published in 2010. Simons and Chabris were awarded an Ig Nobel Prize for the Invisible Gorilla experiment.

== Bibliography ==
- The Invisible Gorilla, Crown, 2010
- Nobody's Fool, Basic Books, 2023
