= Blindness (disambiguation) =

Blindness is a visual condition.

Blindness may also refer to:

- Blindness (novel), a 1995 novel by Portuguese author José Saramago
- Blindness, a 1926 novel by English author Henry Green
- Blindness (2008 film), a 2008 film adaptation of the 1995 novel
- Blindness (2016 film), a 2016 Polish film
- "Blindness", a song by Metric from the 2009 album Fantasies
- Blindness (The Murder Capital album), a 2025 album by Irish band The Murder Capital
- "Blindness" (Perception), a 2013 television episode
- "Blindness" (Saving Hope), a 2012 television episode
- Blindness Records

== See also ==
- List of blindness effects
- Mind-blindness, a disability to be aware of mental states
- Willful blindness, a legal term for a deliberate attempt to avoid knowledge of illegal activities
