= Repetition blindness =

Repetition blindness (RB) is a phenomenon observed in rapid serial visual presentation. People are sometimes poor at recognizing when things happen twice. Repetition blindness is the failure to recognize a second happening of a visual display.

The two displays are shown sequentially, possibly with other stimuli displays in between. Each display is only shortly shown, usually for about 150 milliseconds (Kanwisher, 1987). If stimuli are shown in between, RB can occur in a time interval up to 600 milliseconds. Without other stimuli displayed in between the two repeated stimuli, RB only lasts about 250 milliseconds (Luo & Caramazza, 1995). Repetition blindness tasks usually are words in lists and in sentences. They are called phonologically similar items (Bavelier & Potter, 1992). There are also pictures, and words that include pictures. An example of this is a picture of the sun and the word sun (Bavelier, 1994). The most popular task used to examine repetition blindness is to show words one after another on a screen fast in which participants must recall the words that they saw. This task is known as the rapid serial visual presentation (RSVP).

Repetition blindness is present if missing the second word creates an inaccurate sentence. An example of this is "When she spilled the ink there was ink all over." An RSVP sequence participants will recall seeing "When she spilled the ink there was all over." However, they are missing the second occurrence of "ink" (Kanwisher, 1987). This finding supports that people are "blind" for the second occurrence of a repetitive item in an RSVP series. For example, a subject's chances of correctly reporting both appearances of the word "cat" in the RSVP stream "dog mouse cat elephant cat snake" are lower than their chances of reporting the third and fifth words in the stream "dog mouse cat elephant pig snake".

Another popular example of repetition blindness is the lack of stimuli upon reading text containing consecutive repeated words, most notably the definite article the. (Example: "I have to go to the the store every evening.") Perceptual grouping of repeated items can attenuate repetition blindness. When repeated items are organized into a group, they are more likely to be detected, suggesting that grouping can partially overcome the failure to register the second occurrence of an identical item.

== Causes ==
The precise mechanism underlying RB has been extensively debated. Nancy Kanwisher has argued that it involves failure to tokenize the second appearance of a repeated stimulus and create a separate mental record for the second instance. Tokenization, here, means the ability to identify the second stimulus as a second individual, or token. Lack of tokenization means that the second appearance of the stimulus is being dropped from short term memory before it can be identified, and hence, remains unreportable. However, Whittlesea and colleagues have argued that repetition blindness arises from a failure to properly reconstruct the list, both online and post list. This failure to properly reconstruct the list arises from the poor encoding cues that are the result of the RSVP task.

== See also ==
- Attentional blink
- Semantic satiation
