= Daniel Simons =

American psychologist (born 1969)

- Born: 1969 (age 56–57)
- Education: PhD Cornell University; BA Carleton College
- Known for: "Gorillas in Our Midst"
- Scientific career
- Fields: Psychology change blindness inattentional blindness Visual attention Visual perception
- Workplaces: University of Illinois at Urbana-Champaign; Harvard University
- Doctoral advisor: Frank Keil

Daniel James Simons (born 1969) is an experimental psychologist, cognitive scientist, and Professor in the Department of Psychology and the Beckman Institute for Advanced Science and Technology at the University of Illinois.

Simons is best known for his work on change blindness and inattentional blindness, two surprising examples of how people can be unaware of information right in front of their eyes. His research interests also include visual cognition, perception, memory, attention, and awareness.

== Biography ==
=== Career ===
Simons received a B.A. in psychology from Carleton College in 1991 and a Ph.D. from Cornell University in 1997. Simons then spent 5 years at Harvard University, first as an Assistant professor and then as a John Loeb Associate Professor. In 2002, Simons became a professor at the University of Illinois at Urbana–Champaign where he runs the Visual Cognition Laboratory.

=== Research ===
Professor Simons' research has focused on the cognitive underpinnings of our experience of a stable and continuous visual world. One line of research focuses on change blindness. These failures to notice large changes to scenes suggest that we are aware of far less of our visual world than we think. Related studies explore what aspects of our environment automatically capture attention and what objects and events go unnoticed. Such studies reveal the surprising extent of inattentional blindness - the failure to notice unusual and salient events in their visual world when attention is otherwise engaged and the events are unexpected. Other active research interests include scene perception, object recognition, visual memory, visual fading, attention, and driving and distraction. Research in his laboratory adopts methods ranging from real-world and video-based approaches to computer-based psychophysical techniques, and it includes basic behavioral measures, eye tracking, simulator studies, and training studies.

=== Awards ===
In 2003, Simons won the American Psychological Association Distinguished Scientific Award for Early Career Contributions to Psychology. He was also an Alfred P. Sloan Research Fellow from 1999 to 2003. In 2004, Simons and his collaborator, Christopher Chabris, won the Ig Nobel Prize for demonstrating that even gorillas can become invisible when people are attending to something else.
