= Inattentional blindness =

Condition of failing to see something in plain view

Inattentional blindness or perceptual blindness (rarely called inattentive blindness) occurs when an individual fails to perceive an unexpected stimulus in plain sight because their attention is focused elsewhere, rather than any vision defects or deficits. When it becomes impossible to attend to all the stimuli in a given situation, a temporary "blindness" effect can occur in which individuals fail to see unexpected but often salient objects or stimuli. Inattentional blindness is similar to change blindness in which the observer fails to notice changes that occur slowly in a scene.

The term was chosen by Arien Mack and Irvin Rock in 1992 and was used as the title of their book of the same name, published by MIT Press in 1998, in which they describe the discovery of the phenomenon and include a collection of procedures used in describing it. A famous study that demonstrated inattentional blindness asked participants whether or not they noticed a person in a gorilla costume walking through the scene of a visual task they had been given.

Research on inattentional blindness suggests that the phenomenon can occur in any individual, independent of cognitive deficits. However, recent evidence shows that patients with attention deficit hyperactivity disorder (ADHD) performed better attentionally when engaging in inattentional blindness tasks than control patients did, suggesting that some types of neuro-divergence may decrease the effects of this phenomenon. Recent studies have also looked at age differences and inattentional blindness scores, and results show that the effect increases as humans age. There is mixed evidence that consequential unexpected objects are noticed more: Some studies suggest that humans can detect threatening unexpected stimuli more easily than nonthreatening ones, but other studies suggest that this is not the case. There is some evidence that objects associated with reward are noticed more.

Numerous experiments and art works have demonstrated that inattentional blindness also has an effect on people's perception.

== Criteria ==
The following criteria are required to classify an event as an inattentional blindness episode: 1) the observer must fail to notice a visual object or event, 2) the object or event must be fully visible, 3) observers must be able to readily identify the object if they are consciously perceiving it, and 4) the event must be unexpected and the failure to see the object or event must be due to the engagement of attention on other aspects of the visual scene and not due to aspects of the visual stimulus itself. Individuals who experience inattentional blindness are usually unaware of this effect, which can play a role on behavior or subsequent recall.

Inattentional blindness is related to but distinct from other failures of visual awareness such as change blindness, repetition blindness, visual masking, and attentional blink. The key aspect of inattentional blindness which makes it distinct from other failures in awareness rests on the fact that the undetected stimulus is unexpected. It is the unexpected nature of said stimulus that differentiates inattentional blindness from failures of awareness such as attentional failures like the aforementioned attentional blink. It is critical to acknowledge that occurrences of inattentional blindness are attributed to the failure to consciously attend to an item in the visual field as opposed the absence of cognitive processing.

Findings such as inattentional blindness – the failure to notice a fully visible but unexpected object because attention was engaged on another task, event, or object – has changed views on how the brain stores and integrates visual information, and has led to further questioning and investigation of the brain and importantly of cognitive processes.

=== Cognitive capture ===
Cognitive capture or, cognitive tunneling, is an inattentional blindness phenomenon in which the observer is too focused on instrumentation, task at hand, internal thought, etc. and not on the present environment. For example, while driving, a driver focused on the speedometer and not on the road is suffering from cognitive capture. (Note: Note: The term has also been applied to the "cognitive capture" of government regulatory agencies by the industries they are charged with regulating. The regulators may be seen as being so "captured" by the industry that they focus all their energy on the welfare of the industry and not on the welfare of the public. This concept may interact with "cognitive dissonance" to explain why people create local cultures that reflect some of the values in their local community, while completely ignoring others.)

== Early vs. late selection of attention ==
One of the foremost conflicts among researchers of inattentional blindness surrounds the processing of unattended stimuli. More specifically, there is disagreement in the literature about exactly how much processing of a visual scene is completed before selection dictates which stimuli will be consciously perceived, and which will not be (i.e. inattentional blindness). Two basic schools of thought exist on the issue – those who believe selection occurs early in the perceptual process, and those who believe it occurs only after significant processing. Early selection theorists propose that perception of stimuli is a limited process requiring selection to proceed. This suggests that the decision to attend to specific stimuli occurs early in processing, soon after the rudimentary study of physical features; only those selected stimuli are then fully processed. On the other hand, proponents of late selection theories argue that perception is an unlimited operation, and all stimuli in a visual scene are processed simultaneously. In this case, selection of relevant information is done after full processing of all stimuli.

While early research on the topic was heavily focused on early selection, research since the late 1970s has been shifted mainly to the late selection theories. This change resulted primarily from a shift in paradigms used to study inattentional blindness which revealed new aspects of the phenomenon. Today, late selection theories are generally accepted, and continue to be the focus of the majority of research concerning inattentional blindness.

=== Evidence for late selection ===
A significant body of research has been gathered in support of late selection in the perception of visual stimuli.

One of the popular ways of investigating late selection is to assess the priming properties (i.e. influencing subsequent acts) of unattended stimuli. Often used to demonstrate such effects is the stem completion task. While there exist a few variations, these studies generally consist of showing participants the first few letters of words, and asking them to complete the string of letters to form an English word. It has been demonstrated that observers are significantly more likely to complete word fragments with the unattended stimuli presented in a trial than with another similar word. This effect holds when stimuli are not words, but instead objects. When photos of objects are shown too quickly for participants to identify, subsequent presentation of those items lead to significantly faster identification in comparison to novel objects.

A notable study by Mack and Rock has also revealed that showing a word stimulus differing from the participant's name by one letter did not generally call conscious attention. By simply changing a character, transforming the presented word into the observer's first name, the now highly meaningful stimulus is significantly more likely to be attended to. This suggests that the stimuli are being extensively processed, at least enough to analyze their meaning. These results point to the fact that attentional selection may be determined late in processing.

The evidence outlined above suggests that even when stimuli are not processed to the level of conscious attention, they are nonetheless perceptually and cognitively processed, and can indeed exert effects on subsequent behavior.

=== Evidence for early selection ===
While the evidence supporting late selection hypotheses is significant and has been consistently reproduced, there also exists a body of research suggesting that unattended stimuli in fact may not receive significant processing.

For example, in a functional magnetic resonance imaging (fMRI) study by Rees and colleagues, brain activity was recorded while participants completed a perceptual task. Here they examined the neural processing of meaningful (words) and meaningless (consonant string) stimuli both when attended to, and when these same items were unattended. While no difference in activation patterns were found between the groups when the stimuli were unattended, differences in neural processing were observed for meaningful versus meaningless stimuli to which participants overtly attended. This pattern of results suggests that ignored stimuli are not processed to the level of meaning, i.e. less extensively than attended stimuli. Participants do not seem to be detecting meaning in stimuli to which they are not consciously attending.

Some visual input information is only available in the primary visual cortex (V1) and not visible to visual awareness. One such information is regarding which eye sees which visual inputs. However, this information has been observed to guide attentional or gaze shifts, indicating a selection at the very first stage when visual inputs enter visual cortex. This information about the eye of origin of visual inputs is then deleted by V2, right after V1 along the visual pathway, since V2 neurons' responses to visual inputs do not depend on from which eye the visual inputs come from.

== Theories ==
=== Perceptual load ===
This particular hypothesis bridges the gap between the early and late selection theories. Authors integrate the viewpoint of early selection stating that perception is a limited process (i.e. cognitive resources are limited), and that of the late selection theories assuming perception as an automatic process. This view proposes that the level of processing which occurs for any one stimulus is dependent on the current perceptual load. That is, if the current task is attentionally demanding and its processing exhausts all the available resources, little remains available to process other non-target stimuli in the visual field. Alternatively, if processing requires a small amount of attentional resources, perceptual load is low and attention is inescapably directed to the non-target stimuli.

The effects of perceptual load on the occurrence of inattentional blindness is demonstrated in a study by Fougnie and Marois. Here, participants were asked to complete a memory task involving either the simple maintenance of verbal stimuli, or the rearrangement of this material, a more cognitively demanding exercise. While subjects were completing the assigned task, an unexpected visual stimulus was presented. Results revealed that unexpected stimuli were more likely to be missed during manipulation of information than in the more simple rehearsal task.

In a similar type of study, fMRI recordings were done while subjects took part in either low-demand or high-demand subtraction tasks. While performing these exercises, novel visual distractors were presented. When task demands were low and used a smaller portion of the finite resources, distractors captured attention and sparked visual analysis as shown by brain activation in the primary visual cortex. These results, however, did not hold when perceptual load was high; in this condition, distractors were significantly less often attended to and processed.

Thus, higher perceptual load, and therefore more significant use of attentional resources, appears to increase the likelihood of inattentional blindness episodes.

=== Inattentional amnesia ===
The theory of inattentional amnesia provides an alternative in the explanation of inattentional blindness in suggesting that the phenomenon does not stem from failures in capture of attention or in actual perception of stimuli, but instead from a failure in memory. The unnoticed stimuli in a visual scene are attended to and consciously perceived, but are rapidly forgotten rendering them impossible to report. In essence, inattentional amnesia refers to the failure in creating a lasting explicit memory: by the time a subject is asked to recall seeing an item, their memory for the stimulus has vanished.

While it is difficult to tease apart a failure in perception from one in memory, some research has attempted to shed light on the issue. In a now-classic study of inattentional blindness, a woman carrying an umbrella through a scene goes unnoticed. Despite stopping the video while she is walking through and immediately asking participants to identify which of two people they have seen – leaving as little delay as possible between presentation and report – observers very often fail to correctly identify the woman with the umbrella. No differences in performance were identified whether the video was stopped immediately after the unexpected event or moments later. These findings would seem to oppose the idea of inattentional amnesia; however, advocates of the theory could always contend that the memory test simply came too late and that the memory had already been lost.

=== Expectation ===
The very phenomenon of inattentional blindness is defined by a lack of expectation for the unattended stimulus. Some researchers believe that it is not inattention that produces blindness, but in fact the aforementioned lack of expectation for the stimuli. Proponents of this theory often state that classic methods for testing inattentional blindness are not manipulating attention per se, but instead the expectation for the presentation of a visual item.

Studies investigating the effect of expectation on episodes of inattentional blindness have shown that once observers are made aware of the importance of the stimuli to be presented, for example stating that one will later be tested on it, the phenomenon essentially disappears. While admitting to possible ambiguities in methodology, Mack, one of the foremost researchers in the field, holds strongly that inattentional blindness stems predominantly from a failure of attentional capture. She points out that if expectation does not mediate instances of very closely linked phenomena such as attentional blink and change blindness (whereby participants have difficulty identifying the changing object even when they are explicitly told to look for it), it is unlikely that inattentional blindness can be explained solely by a lack of expectation for stimulus presentation.

=== Perceptual cycle ===
The perceptual cycle framework has been used as another theoretical basis for inattentional blindness. The perceptual cycle framework describes attention capture and awareness capture as occurring at two different stages of processing. Attention capture occurs when there is a shift in attention due to the salience of a stimuli, and awareness capture refers to the conscious acknowledgement of stimuli. Attentional sets are important because it is composed of characteristics of stimuli an individual is processing. Inattentional blindness occurs when there is an interaction between an individual's attentional set and the salience of the unexpected stimulus. Recognizing the unexpected stimulus can occur when the characteristics of the unexpected stimulus resembles the characteristics of the perceived stimuli. The attentional set theory of inattentional blindness has implications for false memories and eyewitness testimony. The perceptual cycle framework offers four major implications about inattentional blindness 1) environmental cues aid in the detection of stimuli by providing orienting cues but is not enough to produce awareness, 2) perception requires effortful sustained attention, interpretation, and reinterpretation, 3) implicit memory may precede conscious perception, and 4) visual stimuli that is not expected, explored, or interpreted may not be perceived.

Other bases for attentional blindness include top down and bottom up processing.

== Experiments ==
To test for inattentional blindness, researchers ask participants to complete a primary task while an unexpected stimulus is presented. Afterwards, researchers ask participants if they saw anything unusual during the primary task. Arien Mack and Irvin Rock describe a series of experiments that demonstrated inattentional blindness in their 1998 book, Inattentional Blindness.

=== Invisible Gorilla Test ===
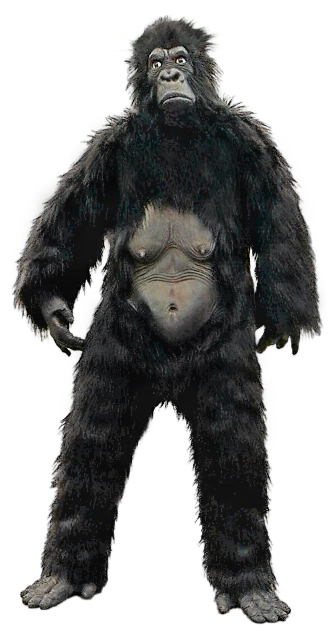
A person in a gorilla suit

The best-known study demonstrating inattentional blindness is the Invisible Gorilla Test, conducted by Daniel Simons of the University of Illinois at Urbana–Champaign and Christopher Chabris of Harvard University. The paper describing the study, "Gorillas in Our Midst: Sustained Inattentional Blindness for Dynamic Events", was published in the journal Perception in 1999. This study, a revised version of earlier studies conducted by Ulric Neisser, Neisser and Becklen in 1975, asked subjects to watch a short video of two groups of people (either wearing black or white T-shirts) passing a basketball around. The subjects are told either to count the passes made by one of the teams or to keep count of bounce passes vs. aerial passes. In different versions of the video a person walks through the scene carrying an umbrella (as discussed above) or wearing a full gorilla suit. After watching the video, the subjects are asked whether they noticed anything out of the ordinary taking place. In most groups, 50% of the subjects did not report seeing the gorilla (or the person with the umbrella). Failure to perceive the anomalies is attributed to failure to attend to it while engaged in the difficult task of counting passes of the ball. These results indicate that the relationship between what is in one's visual field and perception is based much more on attention than was previously thought.

Out of 228 participants of the tests, only 194 – those who did count the passes correctly – were used for statistical purposes further. The percentage was even as low as 8% in one of the 16 tests performed.

The basic Simons and Chabris study was reused on British television as a public safety advert designed to point out the potential dangers to cyclists caused by inattentional blindness in motorists. In the advert the gorilla is replaced by a moonwalking bear.

=== A real-world experiment ===
In 1995, Officer Kenny Conley was chasing a shooting suspect. An undercover officer was in the same vicinity and was mistakenly taken down by other officers while Conley ran by and failed to notice. A jury later convicted Officer Conley of perjury and obstruction of justice, believing he had seen the fight and lied about it to protect fellow officers, yet he stood by his word that he had, in fact, not seen it.

Christopher Chabris, Adam Weinberger, Matthew Fontaine and Daniel J. Simons took it upon themselves to see if this scenario was possible. They designed an experiment in which participants were asked to run about 30 feet behind an experimenter, and count how many times he touched his head. A fight was staged to appear about 8 meters off the path, and was visible for approximately 15 seconds. The procedure in its entirety lasted about 2 minutes and 45 seconds, and participants were then asked to report the number of times they had seen the experimenter touch his head with either hand (medium load), both hands (high load), or were not instructed to count at all (low load). After the run, participants were asked 3 questions: 1) If they had noticed the fight; 2) if they had noticed a juggler, and 3) if they had noticed someone dribbling a basketball. Questions 2) and 3) were red herring control questions, and no one falsely reported these as true.

Participants were significantly more likely to notice the fight when the experiment was done during the day as opposed to in the dark. Additionally, sightings of the fight were most likely to be reported in the low load condition (72%) than in either the medium load (56%), or high load conditions (42%). These results exemplify a real world occurrence of inattentional blindness, and provide evidence that officer Conley could indeed have missed the fight because his attention was focused elsewhere. Moreover, these results add to the body of knowledge suggesting that as perceptual load increases, less resources remain to process items not explicitly focused on, and in turn episodes of inattentional blindness become more frequent.

=== Computer red cross experiment ===
Another experiment was conducted by Steven Most, along with Daniel Simons, Christopher Chabris and Brian Scholl. Instead of a basketball game, they used stimuli presented by computer displays. In this experiment objects moved randomly on a computer screen. Participants were instructed to attend to the black objects and ignore the white, or vice versa. After several trials, a red cross unexpectedly appeared and traveled across the display, remaining on the computer screen for five seconds. The results of the experiment showed that even though the cross was distinctive from the black and white objects both in color and shape, about a third of participants missed it. They had found that people may be attentionally tuned to certain perceptual dimensions, such as brightness or shape. Inattentional blindness is most likely to occur if the unexpected stimuli presented resembles the environment.

=== Clown on a unicycle ===
One experiment displayed how cell phones contributed to inattentional blindness in basic tasks such as walking. The stimulus for this experiment was a brightly colored clown on a unicycle. The individuals participating in this experiment were divided into four sections. They were either talking on the phone, listening to a digital audio player, walking by themselves or walking in pairs. The study showed that individuals engaged in cell phone conversations were least likely to notice the clown.

=== Social inattentional blindness ===
One experiment investigated inattentional blindness in the work domain. Using virtual reality, participants were immersed in a group decision making environment and required to make a decision based on information shared by the other team members. During the experiment a team member repeated another team member's idea and erroneously received credit for the idea, a case of idea stealing. Results showed that only 30% of participants noticed the incidence of idea stealing. This paper highlights the role that inattentional blindness plays in real-world social interactions and organizational behavior.

=== Blindness despite fixation ===
Daniel Memmert conducted an experiment which suggests that an individual can look directly at an object and still not perceive it. This experiment was based on the invisible gorilla experiment. The participants were children with an average age of 7.7 years. Participants watched a short video of a six-player basketball game (three with white shirts, three with black shirts). The participants were instructed to watch only the players wearing black shirts and to count the times the team passed the ball. During the video a person in a gorilla suit walks through the scene. The film was projected onto a large screen (3.2 m X 2.4 m) and the participants sat in a chair 6 meters from the screen. Participants' eye movement and fixations were recorded during the video, and afterward the participants answered a series of questions.

Only 40% of the participants reported seeing the gorilla. There was no significant difference in accuracy of the counting between the two groups. Analyzing the eye movement and fixation data showed no significant difference in time spent looking at the players (black or white) between the two groups. However, the 60% of participants who did not report seeing the gorilla spent an average of 25 frames (about one second) fixated on the gorilla, despite not perceiving it.

A more common example of blindness despite fixation is illustrated in the game of Three-card Monte.

=== Effects of expertise ===
Another experiment conducted by Daniel Memmert tested the effects of different levels of expertise can have on inattentional blindness. The participants in this experiment included six different groups: Adult basketball experts with an average of twelve years of experience, junior basketball experts with an average of five years, children who had practiced the game for an average of two years, and novice counterparts for each age group. In this experiment the participants watched the invisible gorilla experiment video. The participants were instructed to watch only the players wearing white and to count the times the team passed the ball.

The results showed that experts did not count the passes more accurately than novices but did show that adult subjects were more accurate than the junior and child subjects. A much higher percentage of experts noticed the gorilla compared with novices and even the practiced children. 62% of the adult experts and 60% of the junior experts noticed the gorilla, suggesting that the difference between five and twelve years of experience has minimal effect on inattentional blindness. However, only 38% of the adult, 35% of the junior, and none of the child novices noticed the gorilla. Only 18% of the children with two years of practice noticed. This suggests that both age and experience can have a significant effect on inattentional blindness.

=== The cross ===
Based on the experiment performed by Mack and Rock, Ula Finch and Nilli Lavie tested participants with a perceptual task. They presented subjects with a cross, one arm being longer than the other, for 5 trials. On the sixth trial, a white square was added to the top left of the screen. The results conclude that out of 10 participants, only 2 (20%) actually saw the square. This would suggest that when a higher focus was attended to the length of the crossed arms, the more likely someone would altogether miss an object that was in plain sight.

== Limitations of perception and memory ==
Arien Mack and Irvin Rock's concluded in 1998 that no conscious perception can occur without attention. Evidence through research on inattentional blindness contemplates that it may be possible that inattentional blindness reflects a problem with memory rather than with perception. It is argued that at least some instances of inattentional blindness are better characterized as memory failures than perceptual failures. The extent to which unattended stimuli fail to engage perceptual processing is an empirical question that the combination of inattentional blindness and other various measures of processing can be used to address.

The theory behind inattentional blindness research suggests that we consciously experience only those objects and events to which we directly attend. That means that the vast majority of information in our field of vision goes unnoticed. Thus if we miss the target stimulus in an experiment, but are later told about the existence of the stimulus, this sufficient awareness allows participants to report and recall the stimulus now that attention has been allocated to it. Mack and Rock, and their colleagues discovered a striking array of visual events to which people are inattentionally blind. However the debate arises whether this inattentional blindness was due to memory or perceptual processing limitations.

Mack and Rock note that explanations for inattentional blindness can reflect a basic failure of perceptual processes to be engaged by unattended stimuli. Or that it may reflect a failure of memorial processes to encode information about unattended stimuli. The memory failure does not have to do with forgetting something that has been encoded by losing access to the memory of the stimulus from time of presentation to time of retrieval. Instead, the failure is attributed to information not being encoded when the stimulus was present. It seems that inattentional blindness can be explained by both memory and perceptual failures because in experimental research participants may fail to report what was on display due to failures in encoded information (memory) or a failure in perceptually processed information (perception).

== Neuropsychological analogies ==
There are similarities in the types of unconscious processing apparent in inattentional blindness and in neuropsychological syndromes such as visual neglect and extinction. The analogy between these phenomenon's seems to generate more questions as well as answers. These answers are fundamental for our understanding of the relationship between attention, stimulus coding and behavior.

=== Visual neglect ===
Animation. Parietal lobe (red) of left cerebral hemisphere.

Research has shown that some aspects of the syndrome of unilateral visual neglect appear to be similar to normal subjects in a state of inattentional blindness. In neglect, patients with lesions to the parietal cortex fail to respond to and report stimuli presented on the side of space contralateral to damage. That is, they appear to be functionally blind to a range of stimuli. Since such lesions do not result in any sensory deficits, shortcomings have been explained in terms of a lack of attentional processing, for which the parietal cortex plays a large role. These phenomena draw strong parallels to one another, as in both cases stimuli are perceptible but unreported when unattended.

=== Extinction ===
In the phenomenon of extinction, patients can report the presence of a single stimulus presented on the affected side, but then fail to detect it when a second stimulus is presented simultaneously on the "good" (ipsilateral) side. Here the stimulus on the affected side seems to lose under conditions of attentional competition from stimuli in the ipsilesional field. The consequence of this competition is that the extinguished items may not be detected.

Similar to studies of inattentional blindness, there is evidence of processing taking place in the neglected field. For example, there can be semantic priming from a stimulus presented in the neglected field, which affects responses to stimuli subsequently presented on the unimpaired side. Apparently in both neglect and inattentional blindness, there is some level processing of stimuli even when they are unattended. However one major difference between neuropsychological symptoms such as neglect and extinction, and inattentional blindness concerns the role of expectation. In inattentional blindness, subjects do not expect the unreported stimulus. In contrast, in neglect and extinction, patients may expect a stimulus to be presented on the affected side but still fail to report it when another it may be that expectation affects reportability but not the implicit processing of stimuli.

Further explanations of the phenomenon of inattentional blindness include inattentional amnesia, inattentional agnosia and change blindness.

=== Inattentional agnosia ===
An explanation for this phenomenon is that observers see the critical object in their visual field but fail to process it extensively enough to retain it. Individuals experience inattentional agnosia after having seen the target stimuli but not consciously being able to identify what the stimuli is. It is possible that observers are not even able to identify that the stimuli they are seeing are coherent objects. Thus observers perceive some representation of the stimuli but are actually unaware of what that stimulus is. It is because the stimulus is not encoded as a specific thing, that it later is not remembered. Individuals fail to report what the stimuli is after it has been removed. However, despite a lack in ability to fully process the stimuli, experiments have shown a priming effect of the critical stimuli. This priming effect indicates that the stimuli must have been processed to some degree, this occurs even if observers are unable to report what the stimuli is.

=== Change blindness ===
Inattentional blindness is the failure to see a stimulus, such as an object that is present in a visual field. However, change blindness is the failure to notice something different about a visual display. Change blindness is directly related to memory, individuals who experience the effects of change blindness fail to notice something different about a visual display from one moment to the next. In experiments that test for this phenomenon participants are shown an image that is then followed by another duplicate image that has had a single change made to it. Participants are asked to compare and contrast the two images and identify what the change is. In inattentional blindness experiments, participants fail to identify some stimulus in a single display, a phenomenon that does not rely on memory the way change blindness does. Inattentional blindness refers to an inability to identify an object all together whereas change blindness is a failure to compare a new image or display to one that was previously stored in memory.

== Additional factors ==
=== Age and expertise ===
In 2006, Daniel Memmert conducted a series of studies in which he tested how the age and expertise of participants affect inattentional blindness. Using the gorilla video, he tested 6 different groups of participants. There were 2 groups of children (average age=7) half with no experience in basketball, and the other half with 2 years experience; 2 groups of juniors (average age=13) half with no experience in basketball, and the other half with 5 years of experience; and 2 groups of adults (average age = 24) half with no experience in basketball, the other half with over 12 years of experience. He then instructed all the groups to keep track of how many passes the people on the black team made.

Overall, the children with or without any basketball experience failed to perceive the gorilla more than the juniors or the adults. There were no significant difference between the inexperienced junior and adult groups, or between the experienced junior and adult groups. This pattern of results suggests that until the approximate age of 13, presumably because certain aspects of cognition are still under development, inattentional blindness occurrences are more frequent, but become consistent throughout the remainder of the life span.

Additionally, the juniors with basketball experience noticed the gorilla significantly more than the juniors with no basketball experience; and the group of experienced adults noticed the gorilla significantly more than the non-experienced adults. This suggests that if one has had much experience with the stimuli in a visual field, they are more likely to consciously perceive the unexpected object.

In 2011, Elizabeth Graham and Deborah Burke conducted a study that assessed whether or not older adults are more susceptible to inattentional blindness than younger adults by having 51 younger-aged participants (17 to 22 years) and 61 older-aged participants (61 to 81 years) watch the classic gorilla video. Overall, they found that younger-aged participants were more likely to notice the unexpected gorilla than older-aged participants.

In a 2015 study, Cary Stothart, Walter Boot, and Daniel Simons attempted to replicate and extend the findings from both Graham and Burke's 2011 study and Steven Most and colleague's 2000 study on Amazon Mechanical Turk using a sample of 515 participants that varied in age. In this study, participants were tasked with counting the number of times a number of white moving objects crossed the vertical midpoint of a display while ignoring a number of black moving objects. The unexpected object in this case was a gray cross that moved horizontally across the display at various distances from the vertical midpoint (this was manipulated between participants). Overall, they found that inattentional blindness susceptibility increases with age, which replicates the finding from Graham and Burke. In fact, they found that every 10 years of age was associated with a 1.3 fold increase in the probability of displaying inattentional blindness. They also found that the probability of inattentional blindness increases as the distance between the observer's focus of attention and the unexpected object increases, which replicates the finding from Most and colleagues. However, they also found that the relationship that age has with inattentional blindness does not change as a function of the unexpected object's distance from the focus of attention, suggesting that useful field of view does not mediate the relationship between age and inattentional blindness.

=== Similarity between stimuli ===
A series of studies conducted to test how similarity can influence the perception of a present stimulus. In the study, they asked participants to fixate on a central point on a computer screen and count how many times either white or black letters bounced off the edges of the screen. The first 2 trials did not contain an unexpected event, but the third trial was the critical trial in which a cross that had the same dimensions as the letters and varied in colour (white/light gray/dark gray/black) moved from the right side of the screen to the left side and passed through the central point. The results revealed the following: during the critical event, the more similar the colour of the cross was to the colour of the attended letters, the more likely the participants were to perceive it, and the less similar the colour of the cross was to the attended colour decreased the likelihood of the cross being noticed. For the participants attending to the black letters, 94% perceived the black cross; 44% perceived the dark gray cross; 12% perceived the light gray cross, and only 6% perceived the white cross. Similarly, if the participant was attending to the white letters, they were more likely to notice the cross it was white (94%) than if it was light gray (75%), dark gray (56%), or black (0%). This study demonstrates that the more similar an unexpected object is to the attended object, the more likely it is to be perceived, thus reducing the chance of inattentional blindness.

=== Mindfulness ===
A large experiment conducted on 794 participants by Schofield, Creswell and Denson found evidence that completing a brief mindfulness exercise reduced rates on inattentional blindness, but did not improve the depth of encoding of the unexpected distractor. Participants in this experiment engaged in a guided-audio task of mindfully eating a raisin, a well-known task introduced by Kabat-Zinn in his mindfulness-based stress reduction program, or listened to factual descriptions about raisins. The audio recordings used to manipulate mindful states in this experiment are freely available online. Participants who completed the raisin-eating task had 41% greater odds of noticing an unexpected red cross that floated across the screen. Participants were then asked to select the shape that had unexpectedly appeared (i.e., the red cross) out of a line-up of 3 red and 3 green shapes. Those in the mindfulness condition were no better than those in the control condition at selecting the red cross out of the line-up. This was true regardless of whether or not detection of the unexpected distractor was statistically controlled. This experiment demonstrated that not only does mindfulness affect inattentional blindness, but that detailed encoding of the unexpected distractor can be dissociated from the detection of the unexpected distractor.

== Possible causes ==
The research that has been done on inattentional blindness suggests that there are four possible causes for this phenomenon. These include: conspicuity, mental workload, expectations, and capacity.

=== Conspicuity ===
Conspicuity refers to an object's ability to catch a person's attention. When something is conspicuous it is easily visible. There are two factors which determine conspicuity: sensory conspicuity and cognitive conspicuity. Sensory conspicuity factors are the physical properties an object has. If an item has bright colors, flashing lights, high contrast with environment, or other attention-grabbing physical properties it can attract a person's attention more easily. For example, people tend to notice objects that are bright colors or crazy patterns before they notice other objects. Cognitive conspicuity factors pertain to objects that are familiar to someone. People tend to notice objects faster if they have some meaning to their lives. For example, when a person hears his/her name, their attention is drawn to the person who said it. The cocktail party effect describes the cognitive conspicuity factor as well. When an object is not conspicuous, it is easier to be inattentionally blind to it. People tend to notice items if they capture their attention in some way. If the object is not visually prominent or relevant, there is a higher chance that a person will miss it.

=== Mental workload and working memory ===
Mental workload is a person's cognitive resources. The amount of a person's workload can interfere with processing of other stimuli. When a person focuses a lot of attention on one stimulus, he/she focuses less attention on other stimuli. For example, talking on the phone while driving – the attention is mostly focused on the phone conversation, so there is less attention focused on driving. The mental workload could be anything from thinking about tasks that need to be done to tending to a baby in the backseat. When people have most of their attention focused on one thing, they are more vulnerable to inattentional blindness. However, the opposite is true as well. When a person has a very small mental workload – he/she is doing an everyday task – the task becomes automatic. Automatic processing can lessen one's mental workload, which can lead to a person to missing the unexpected stimuli.

Working memory also contributes to inattentional blindness. Cognitive psychologists have examined the relationship between working memory and inattention, but evidence is inconclusive. The rate of this phenomenon can be impacted by a number of factors. Researchers have found evidence for a number of components that may play a role. These include features of the object and the current task, where an individual's attention lies relative to the object, and mental workload as mentioned above. Researchers Kreitz, Furley, and Memmery in 2015, asserted that working memory capacity is not an indicator of susceptibility to inattentional blindness. Instead, it is a combination of what stimulus the attention is directed to as well as the individual's personal expectations. There are individual differences that can play a role, but some argue those disparities are separate from capacity for working memory. On the other hand, there are researchers who consider differences between individuals and their working memory capacity to be a stronger determinant of inattentional blindness. Seegmiller, Watson, and Strayer in 2011 for example, studied individual differences in working memory capacity and how that overall impacted their attention on a given task. They utilized the same Invisible Gorilla video Simons and Chabris did (as mentioned above), but they additionally had participants complete a mathematics test to measure their capacity. From their results, they were able to find a high correlation between an individual's working memory capacity and their susceptibility to inattentional blindness. Those who were calculated to have a lower capacity, more often experienced the blindness.

In a follow-up study the same year, Kreitz and her team looked specifically at the cognitive abilities between individuals. Her team employed a variety of tasks, both static and dynamic, to compare the participants who had their cognitive capacity measured beforehand. Even though they included different tasks to test individuals, there was not a measurable relationship between the cognitive abilities of a participant and their attention performance. They did, however, find evidence to support the idea that noticing a certain stimuli was better in those demonstrating expertise in the task subject (referenced above). Overall, Kreitz concluded that cognitive/working memory capacity might not be an accurate measure for inattentional blindness. Instead, they determined that the rate of noticing might be both circumstantial and dependent on the requirements of the task.

There are also researchers who subscribe to the idea that working memory does not play a measurable role in attentional blindness. This is different from the study by Kreitz and her team finding that individual differences in cognitive abilities might not be relative to noticing rates. Bredemeier and Simons conducted two studies in 2012. The first involved identifying the location of letters as well as counting how many times a group of shapes touched one another. These served as spatial and attention tasks respectively. The second study utilized the same tasks as the previous, but included a verbal one. Participants had to solve math problems and then remember a particular letter that followed each equation. From their results, the two researchers questioned if there was a relationship between noticing a particular stimuli and cognitive abilities. Instead of other factors contributing to the working memory of an individual's noticing, Bredemeier and Simons postulated that external variables establish the appearance of this relationship. Finally, the two researchers attempted to explain why studies were yielding conflicting results. The reason for why this research seems particularly inconclusive might be a result of disparities between the design of the actual research. Essentially, a variety of confounded variables might be prevalent across the studies when considering methodology and sampling processes. A more regulated, large-scale experiment could lead to more conclusive findings.

=== Expectation ===
When a person expects certain things to happen, he/she tends to block out other possibilities. This can lead to inattentional blindness. For example, person X is looking for their friend at a concert, and that person knows their friend (person Y) was wearing a yellow jacket. In order to find person Y, person X looks around for people wearing yellow. It is easier to pick a color out of the crowd than a person. However, if person Y took off the jacket, there is a chance person X could walk right past person Y and not notice because he/she was looking for the yellow jacket. Because of expectations, experts are more prone to inattentional blindness than beginners. An expert knows what to expect when certain situations arise. Therefore, that expert will know what to look for. This could cause that person to miss out on other important details that he/she may not have been looking for.

=== Capacity ===
Attentional capacity, or neurological salience, is a measure of how much attention must be focused to complete a task. For example, an expert pianist can play a piano without thinking much, but a beginner would have to consciously think of every note they hit. This capacity can be lessened by drugs, alcohol, fatigue, and age. With a small capacity, it is more possible to miss things. Therefore, a drunk person will probably miss more than a sober person would, and a person with large attentional capacity is less likely to experience inattentional blindness.

== Benefits ==
William James addressed the benefits of attention by saying, "Only those items which I notice shape my mind – without selective interest, experience is utter chaos". Humans have a limited mental capacity that is incapable of attending to all the sights, sounds and other inputs that rush the senses every moment. Inattentional blindness is beneficial in the sense that it is a mechanism that has evolved with attention to help filter out irrelevant input, allowing only important information to reach consciousness. Several researchers, notably James J. Gibson, have argued that, even before the retina, perception begins in the ecology, which has turned perceptual processes into informational relationships in the environment through evolution. This allows humans to focus our limited mental resources more efficiently in our environment. For example, New et al. maintain that survival required monitoring animals, both human and non-human, to become part of the evolutionary adaptiveness of the human species. They found that when participants were shown an image with a rapidly altering scene where the scene change included an animate or inanimate object that the participants were significantly better at identifying humans and animals. New et al. argue that better performance in detecting animals and humans is not a factor of acquired expertise, rather it is an evolved survival mechanism in human perception.

Inattentional blindness is also beneficial as a response to advertising overload. Irrelevant marketing makes it more likely for consumers to ignore initiatives that aim at capturing their attention. This phenomenon called 'purposeful blindness' has a compelling illustration regarding banner ads. Banner blindness shows that consumers can adopt fast and become good at ignoring marketing messages that are not relevant.

== Implications ==
Although the bulk of inattentional blindness research has been conducted in laboratory studies, the phenomenon occurs in a variety of everyday contexts. Depending upon the context, the occurrence of inattentional blindness could range from embarrassing and/or humorous to potentially devastating.

=== Safety ===
Several recent studies of explicit attention capture have found that when observers are focused on some other object or event, they often experience inattentional blindness. This finding has potentially tragic implications for distracted driving. If a person's attention is focused elsewhere while driving, carrying on a conversation or text messaging, for example, they could fail to notice salient and distinctive objects, such as a stop sign, which could lead to serious injury and possibly even death. There have also been heinous incidents attributed to inattentional blindness behind the wheel. For example, a Pennsylvania highway crew accidentally paved over a dead deer that was lying on the road. When questioned regarding their actions, the workers claimed to have never seen it.

Many policies are being implemented around the world to decrease the competition for explicit attention capture while operating a vehicle. For example, there are legislative efforts in many countries aimed at banning or restricting the use of cell phones while driving. Research has shown that the use of both hands-free and hand-held cellular devices while driving results in the failure of attention to explicitly capture other salient and distinctive objects, leading to significantly delayed reaction times, as well as inattentional blindness. A study published in 1997, based on accident data in Toronto, found the risk involved in driving while using a cell phone to be similar to that of driving drunk. In both cases, the risk of a collision was three to six times higher compared to a sober driver not using a cell phone. Moreover, Strayer et al. (2006) found that when controlling for driving difficulty and time on task, cell-phone drivers exhibited greater impairment than intoxicated drivers, using a high-fidelity driving simulator.

Inattentional blindness is also prevalent in aviation. The development of heads-up display (HUD) for pilots, which projects information onto the windshield or onto a helmet-mounted display, has enabled pilots to keep their eyes on the windshield, but simulator studies have found that HUD may cause runway incursion accidents, where one plane collides with another on the runway. This finding is particularly concerning because HUDs are being employed in automobiles, which could lead to potential roadway incursions. When a particular object or event captures attention to the extent to which the beholders' attentional capacity is completely absorbed, the resulting inattentional blindness has been known to cause dramatic accidents. For example, an airliner crew, engrossed with a blinking console light, failed to notice the approaching ground and register hearing the danger alarm sounding before the airliner crashed.

=== Illusion ===
Collaborative efforts to establish links between science and illusion have examined the relationship of the processes underlying inattentional blindness and the concept of misdirection—a magician's ability to manipulate attention in order to prevent his/her audience from seeing how a trick was performed. In several misdirection studies, including Kuhn and Tatler (2005), participants watch a "vanishing item" magic trick. After the initial trial, participants are shown the trick until they detect the item dropping from the magician's hand. Most participants see the item drop on the second trial. The critical analyses involved differences in eye movements between the detected and undetected trials. These repetition trials are similar to the full-attention trial in the inattentional blindness paradigm, as both involve the detection of the unexpected event and, by detecting the unexpected event on the second trial, demonstrate that the event is readily perceivable.

The main difference between inattentional blindness and misdirection involves how attention is manipulated. While inattentional blindness tasks require an explicit distractor, the attentional distraction in misdirection occurs through the implicit yet systematic orchestration of attention. Moreover, there are several varieties of misdirection and different types are likely to induce different cognitive and perceptual processes, which vary the misdirection paradigm's resemblance to inattentional blindness.

Although the aims of magic and illusion differ from those of neuroscience, magicians wish to exploit cognitive weaknesses, whereas neuroscientists seek to understand the brain and the neuronal significance of cognitive functions. Several researchers have argued that neuroscientists and psychologists can learn from incorporating the real world experience and knowledge of magicians into their fields of research. The techniques developed over centuries of stage magic by magicians may also be utilized by neuroscience as powerful probes of human cognition.

=== Police shootings ===
When a police officer's version of events differs from video or forensic evidence, inattentional blindness has been used by defense lawyers as a possibility. The criticism of this defense is that this view could be used to defend nearly any police shooting.

== See also ==
- Attribute substitution
- Choice blindness
- Confirmation bias
- Human factors and ergonomics
- Invisible ships
- Somebody else's problem
- Visual perception
- Highway hypnosis – Altered mental state while driving
