= Change blindness =

Perceptual phenomenon

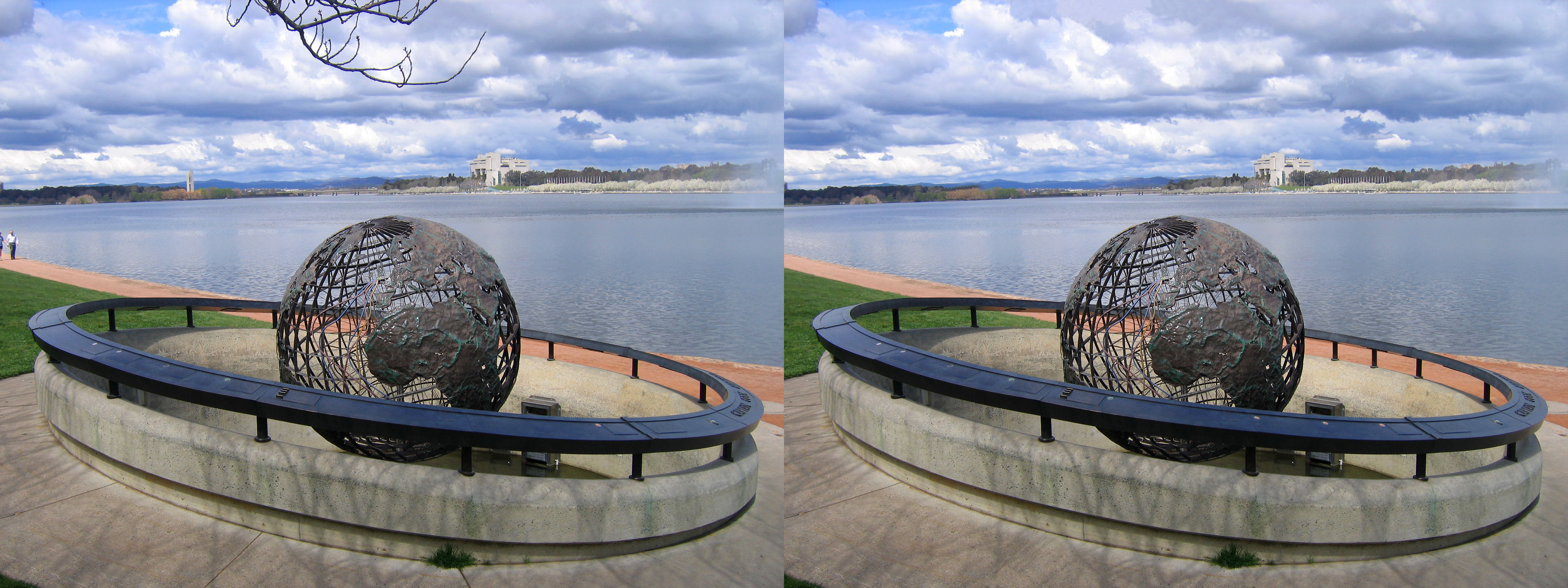
Example of images that can be used in a change blindness task. Although similar, the two images have a number of differences.

Change blindness is a perceptual phenomenon that occurs when a change in a visual stimulus is introduced and the observer does not notice it. For example, observers often fail to notice major differences introduced into an image while it flickers off and on again. People's poor ability to detect changes has been argued to reflect fundamental limitations of human attention. Change blindness has become a highly researched topic and some have argued that it may have important practical implications in areas such as eyewitness testimony and distractions while driving. Some principles underlying change blindness include absence of focused attention, object swap during brief obstructed view, combination of low subjective importance and contrast energy, and viewing context. Change blindness is related to inattentional blindness.

Researchers have focused on change blindness over the years as a way to understand how visual representations are formed. Experiments have consistently shown similar results: unless a change in the visual scene produces a localizable transient signal at a specific position on the retina, people typically fail to detect the change.

== History ==
=== Early anecdotal observations ===
Outside of the domain of psychology, phenomena related to change blindness have been discussed since the 19th century. When film editing was introduced in movies, editors began to notice that changes to the background were not noticed by those watching the film. Going back earlier, William James (1842–1910) was the first to mention the lack of ability to detect change in his book Principles of Psychology (1890).

=== Earliest experimental reports ===
Research on change blindness developed from investigation in other phenomena such as eye movements and working memory. Although individuals have a very good memory as to whether or not they have seen an image, they are generally poor at recalling the smaller details in that image. Moreover, their recall is subject to cognitive mechanisms that may subconsciously alter their memory or shape perception as in sensemaking. When we are visually stimulated with a complex picture, it is more likely that individuals retain only a gist of an image and not the image in its entirety.

The laboratory study of change blindness began in the 1970s within the context of eye movement research. George McConkie conducted the first studies on change blindness involving changes in words and texts; in these studies, the changes were introduced while the observer performed a saccadic eye movement. Observers often failed to notice these changes.

In the late 1980s, the first clear experimental demonstration was published showing very poor change detection in complex displays over brief intervals without eye movements being involved. Pashler (1988) showed that observers were poor at detecting changes introduced into arrays of letters while the display was flickered off and on, even if the offset was as brief as 67 milliseconds (although offsets briefer than that produced much more effective change detection). Pashler concluded by noting how odd it was that people generally report having a "clear sense of apprehending the identities and locations of large numbers of objects in a scene" (p. 377), and that given this introspective sense, it seemed quite surprising how poor is their detection of changes.

=== Research in the 1990s and 2000s ===
Saccadic eye movements have been known to induce change blindness

With the rise of the ability to present complex, real-world images on a computer screen, McConkie, in the early 1990s, as part of new research at the new Beckman Institute for Advanced Science and Technology, renewed investigations of why the world looks stable and continuous despite the shifting retinal input signal that accompanied each saccade. This research began when John Grimes and Dr. George McConkie (1996) began to use actual photographs to study visual stability. This development in change blindness research was able to show the effects of change blindness in more realistic settings. Additionally, further research stated that rather large changes will not be detected when they occur during saccadic movements of the eye. In the first experiment of this kind, in 1995, Blackmore et al. forced saccades by moving the image and making a change in the scene at the same time. Observers' ability to detect the changes fell to chance. The effect was stronger using this method than when using brief grey flashes between images, although subsequent research has mostly used grey flashes or masking stimuli. Another finding based on similar studies stated that a change was easily picked up on by participants when the eye was fixated on the point of change. Therefore, the eye must be directly fixated on the area of change for it to be noticed. This was called the saccade target theory of transsaccadic memory of visual stability. However, other research in the mid-1990s has indicated that individuals still have difficulty detecting change even when they are directly fixated on a particular scene. Rensink, O'Regan, and Clarke presented a picture, followed by a blank, masking screen, followed by the initial picture with a change. The masking screen acts like a saccadic eye movement. This was a critical contribution to change blindness research because it demonstrated that a change can remain unnoticed with the smallest disruptions.

Research on change blindness proceeded one step further into practical applications of this phenomenon. For example, there does not have to be a masking stimulus in order for individuals to miss a change in a scene. Individuals often take significantly longer to notice certain changes if there are a few small, high contrast shapes that are temporarily splattered over a picture. This method for testing change blindness is called "mudsplashes". This method is particularly relevant to individuals driving in a car when there is a visual obstruction on the windshield. This obstruction may impair an individual's ability to detect a change in their environment which could result in severe negative consequences while driving.

== Current research (2010–present) ==
=== Change detection ===
Research indicates that detecting changes in a change blindness task is easier when items are holistically processed, such as faces. Individuals notice a change faster when required to detect changes in facial features than when required to detect changes in images of houses. However, individuals are better at identifying the nature of the change in houses.

Other researchers have discovered that mental processing in change blindness begins even before the change is presented. More specifically, there is increased brain activity in the parietal-occipital and occipital regions prior to the emergence of a change in a change blindness task.

Researchers have also indicated there is a difference in brain activity between detecting a change and identifying change in an image. Detecting a change is associated with a higher ERP (Event-related potential) whereas identifying change is associated with an increased ERP before and after the change was presented.

Additional research using fluctuations in ERPs has observed that changes in pictures (change blindness) are represented in the brain, even without the perceiver's conscious awareness of the change.

Change blindness can be effectively used in the process of visualizing actual changes detected in 3D scenes. With appropriate techniques it is possible to enhance the perception of the portion of a 3D scene that is changed while hiding non significant, but otherwise still visible, changes.

=== In teams ===
Another interesting area of research is the decreased susceptibility to change blindness when individuals are placed in teams. Although change blindness is still observed within teams, research has indicated that changes between images are noticed more when individuals work in teams as opposed to individually. Both teamwork and communication assist teams in correctly identifying changes between images.

=== Expertise ===
Another recent study looked at the relation between expertise and change blindness. Physics experts were more likely to notice a change between two physics problems than novices. It is hypothesized that experts are better at analyzing problems on a deeper level whereas novices employ a surface-level analysis. This research suggests that observing the phenomenon of change blindness may be conditional upon the context of the task.

=== Choice blindness ===
Cognitive psychologists expanded the study of change blindness into decision-making. In one study, they showed participants ten pairs of faces and asked them to choose which face was more attractive. For some pairs, the experimenter used sleight of hand to show participants a face they had not chosen. Only 26% of subjects noticed the mismatch between their choice of face and the different face they were shown instead. The experimenters tested pairs of faces that were either high in similarity or low in similarity, but the detection rate was no different between those conditions. Subjects were also asked to give reasons why they had chosen a face (although due to the sleight of hand they actually hadn't chosen it). Despite the mismatch, subjects gave responses that were comparable in emotionality, specificity, and certainty for faces they had or had not actually chosen. Further research has shown that the failure to detect mismatches between intention and outcome exists in consumer product choices and in political attitudes.

=== Counteraction ===
Prior research in the early part of the decade had shown that change blindness can be counteracted by a number of methods. Shifting attention with a visual cue can help lower the negative effects of change blindness. Stimulation of the superior colliculus improves performance and reaction time in the same way. However, recent research has also been done on countering tactile change blindness. A 2016 study by Riggs et al. shows that three successful methods for limiting tactile change blindness in distinguishing changes in vibration patterns are attention guidance, signal gradation and direct comparison. All three methods seek to bring attention to the area of change. Attention guidance works proactively by increasing the frequency of a cue. The second and third methods are reactive and based on error-feedback. Signal gradation further increases the intensity of the vibration after the change has been missed. Direct comparison pairs the pre-change and post-change vibration intensities without a gap in between after a change has been missed to support the use of relative judgment rather than absolute. While all significantly improve performance, the second and third countermeasures are most effective. Concentration and attention are also a major factors in avoiding change blindness.

=== Non-humans ===
Though comparatively little research has been done on change blindness in other animals, a few species of animals exhibited the same effects of change blindness as humans. Using the same motion detection paradigm for monkeys as humans, researchers found the results were the same in showing change blindness in motion. Pigeons not only demonstrate change blindness, but also are influenced by the salience and timing of the change in scenery like humans. Chimpanzees similarly have difficulty with detecting change in flicker-type visual search after a blank display was shown. Positional switches of a stimulus are the most difficult for chimpanzees to detect. The results show that the same levels of attention is demanded for chimpanzees as humans in these tasks.

== Change detection methods ==
=== Saccade forcing paradigm ===
This method was used in the first, 1995, experiment. A change is made in an image at the same time as the image is moved in an unpredictable direction, forcing a saccade. This method mimics eye movements and can detect change blindness without introducing blank screens, masking stimuli or mudsplashes. However, it is unclear if small additions to an image will predict if people will be unable to notice larger changes in an image to the same position to their eye.

=== Flicker paradigm ===
In this paradigm, an image and an altered image are switched back and forth with a blank screen in the middle. This procedure is performed at a very high rate and observers are instructed to click a button as soon as they see the difference between the two images. This method of studying change blindness has helped researchers discover two very important findings. The first finding is that it usually takes a while for individuals to notice a change even though they are being instructed to search for a change. In some cases, it can even take individuals over one minute of constant flickers to determine the location of the change. The second important finding is that changes to more important areas of a photograph are noticed at a faster rate than changes to areas of less interest. Although the flicker paradigm was first used in the late 1990s, it is still commonly used in current research on change blindness and has contributed to current knowledge on change blindness.

=== Forced choice detection paradigm ===
Individuals who are tested under the forced choice paradigm are only allowed to view the two pictures once before they make a choice. Both images are also shown for the same amount of time. The flicker paradigm and the forced choice detection paradigm are known as intentional change detection tasks, which means that the participants know they are trying to detect change. These studies have shown that even while participants are focusing their attention and searching for a change, the change may remain unnoticed.

=== Mudsplashes ===
Mudsplashes are small, high contrast shapes that are scattered over an image, but do not cover the area of the picture in which the change occurs. This mudsplash effect prevents individuals from noticing the change between the two pictures. A practical application of this paradigm is that dangerous stimuli in a scene may not be noticed if there are slight obstructions in an individual's visual field. Previously, it has been stated that humans hold a very good internal representation of visual stimuli. Studies involving mudsplashes have shown that change blindness may occur because our internal representations of visual stimuli may be much worse than previous studies have shown. Mudsplashes have not been used as frequently as the flicker or forced choice detection paradigms in change blindness research, but have yielded many significant and groundbreaking results.

=== Foreground-background segregation ===
The foreground-background segregation method for studying change blindness uses photographs of scenery with a distinct foreground and background. Researchers using this paradigm have found that individuals are usually able to recognize relatively small changes in the foreground of an image. In addition, large changes to the colour of the background take significantly longer to detect. This paradigm is critical to change blindness research because many previous studies have not examined the location of changes in the visual field.

== Neuroanatomy ==
=== Neuroimaging ===
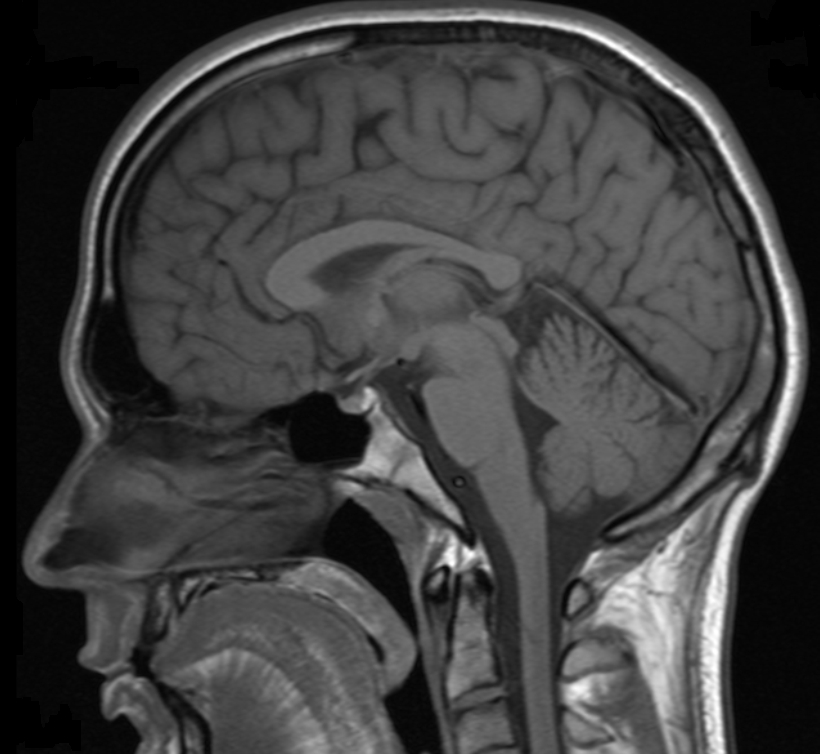
MRI image

Various studies have used MRIs (magnetic resonance imaging) to measure brain activity when individuals detect (or fail to detect) a change in the environment. When individuals detect a change, the neural networks of the parietal and right dorsolateral prefrontal lobe regions are strongly activated. If individuals were instructed to detect changes in faces, the fusiform face area was also significantly activated. In addition, other structures such as the pulvinar, cerebellum, and inferior temporal gyrus also showed an increase in activation when individuals reported a change. It has been proposed that the parietal and frontal cortex along with the cerebellum and pulvinar might be used to direct an organism's attention to a change in the environment. A decrease of activation in these brain areas was observed if a change was not detected by the organism. Furthermore, the neurological activation of these highlighted brain areas was correlated with an individual's conscious awareness of change and not the physical change itself.

Other studies using fMRI (functional magnetic resonance imaging) scanners have shown that when change is not consciously detected, there was a significant decrease in the dorsolateral prefrontal and parietal lobe regions. These results further the importance of the dorsolateral prefrontal and parietal cortex in the detection of visual change. In addition to fMRI studies, recent research has used transcranial magnetic stimulation (TMS) in order to inhibit areas of the brain while participants were instructed to try to detect the change between two images. The results show that when the posterior parietal cortex (PPC) is inhibited, individuals are significantly slower at detecting change. The PPC is critical for encoding and maintaining visual images in short term working memory, which demonstrates the importance of the PPC in terms of detecting changes between images. For a change to be detected, the information of the first picture needs to be held in working memory and compared to the second picture. If the PPC is inhibited, the area of the brain responsible for encoding visual images will not function properly. The information will not be encoded and will not be held in working memory and compared to the second picture, thus inducing change blindness.

=== Role of attention ===
The role of attention is critical for an organism's ability to detect change. In order for an organism to detect change, visual stimulation must enter through eye and proceed through the visual stream in the brain. A study in 2004 demonstrated that if the superior colliculus (responsible for eye movements) of a monkey's brain is electrically stimulated, there would be a significant decrease in reaction time to detect the change. Therefore, it is critical for organisms to attend to the change in order for it to be detected. Organisms are only able to detect this change once the visual stimulation comes through the eye (its movements are controlled by the superior colliculus) and is subsequently processed through the visual stream.

== Influencing factors ==
=== Age ===
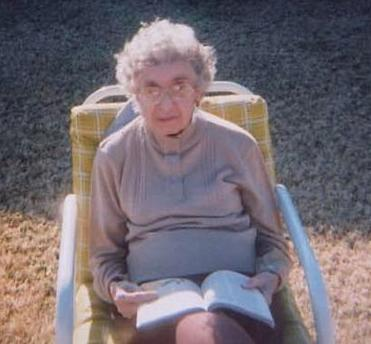
Older individuals have been known to have more difficulty detecting changes.

Age has been implicated as one of the factors which modulates the severity of change blindness. In a study conducted by Veiel et al. it was found that older individuals were slower to detect the changes in a change blindness experiment than were younger individuals. This trend was also noticed by Caird et al., who found that drivers aged 65 and older were more prone to making incorrect decisions after a change blindness paradigm was used at an intersection, than were participants aged 18–64. Age differences in change detection become most pronounced when the task is easier. While the actual shift in ability does not occur until at least age 65, people's confidence in their ability to detect change drops significantly at middle-age.

Children from 6–13 years old looked at colored pictures of real world scenes that were manipulated by color, location of objects, or the removal of objects, in the central or peripheral focus of the image. Adults are more accurate when noticing the changes that occur in the picture. Children can accurately detect central changes, but aren't as good at detecting peripheral changes, and their accuracy depends on the type of manipulation.

Younger drivers (average of 22 years old) were compared with older drivers (average of 69 years old). Images were presented on a screen showing various driving situations that included an original image and a modified image, and participants had to identify where a change had occurred in the modified version, if any. Older drivers expressed reduced accuracy, higher reaction times, and more false positive responses compared to younger drivers.

=== Attention ===
Attention is another factor that has been implicated in change blindness. Increasing shifts in attention decrease the severity of change blindness and changes in the foreground are detected more readily than changes made to the background of an image, an effect of the intentional bias for foreground elements.

Community volunteers had to focus on a screen and accurately identify if there was a change between series of dots after being fixated on a point in the center of the screen. Distraction of attention by visual disruptions and the observers' ability to focus on potential change were found to have an effect on attention with change blindness.

=== Object presentation ===
Object presentation is the way in which objects appear and is a factor that determines the occurrence of change blindness. Change blindness can occur even without a delay between the original image and the altered image, but only if the change in the image forces the viewer to redefine the objects in the image. Additionally, the appearance of a new object is more resistant to change blindness than a looming object, and both the appearance of a new object and the looming of an object are more resistant to change blindness than the receding of an object. Furthermore, the appearance or onset of an object is more resistant to the occurrence of change blindness than the disappearance or offset of an object.

=== Substance use ===
Substance use has been found to affect the detection biases on change detection tasks. If an individual was presented with two changes simultaneously, those that had a change related to the substance they use regularly reported using the substance more than those detecting the neutral stimuli. This indicates a relationship between substance use and change detection within a change blindness paradigm. This bias for devoting more attention to the drug-relevant stimuli is also observed with problem drinkers. Individuals who have a more severe drinking problem are quicker to detect changes in alcohol-related stimuli than in neutral stimuli.

Alcohol can sometimes improve change blindness. For example, intoxicated participants were quicker at detecting minor changes in large displays of images than sober participants. This could be attributed to more passive viewings of larger images, and the use of alcohol slows down more controlled search processes.

Active viewing involves more saccades than fixations. When viewing an image with a more passive search, more information is processed with each fixation. The alcohol slows down the movement and processing of the brain, therefore causing more fixation points.

== In other senses ==
In addition to change blindness induced by changes in visual images, change blindness also exists for the other senses:

- Change deafness – Change deafness is the concept of change blindness for auditory information. In his experiment, Vitevitch (2003) used a speech shadowing task to demonstrate change deafness. He presented a list of words to participants and had them simultaneously repeat the words they heard. Halfway through the list, either the same or a different speaker presented the second half of the words to participants. At least 40% of participants failed to detect the change in speaker when it occurred. Fenn et al. called participants on the phone and replaced the speaker in the middle of the conversation. Participants rarely noticed change. However, when explicitly monitoring for change, the participants' detection increased. Neuhoff et al. (2015) expanded on the idea of change deafness, and identified a new phenomenon called "slow-change deafness" using a series of four experiments. In the first experiment, he had participants listen to continuous speech that changed three semitones in pitch over time. Fifty percent of participants failed to notice the change. In the second and third experiments, listeners were alerted to the possibility of a change. In these trials, detection rates drastically improved. In the fourth experiment, the magnitude of the change that occurred in the stimulus increased, causing the detection rates to increase. These experiments demonstrated that "slow-change deafness" depends on both the magnitude of a stimulus change and the listeners' expectations.
- Olfactory – Humans are constantly in a state of change blindness due to the poor spatial and temporal resolutions with which scents are detected. Although humans' odor detection thresholds are very low, our olfactory attention is only captured by unusually high odorant concentrations. Olfactory input is made up of a series of sniffs separated in time. The long inter-sniff-interval creates "change anosmia," in which humans have trouble discerning smells that are not highly concentrated. This period of sensory habituation as well as very low concentrations of odorants regularly yield no subjective experience. This behavior is called "experiential nothingness".
- Somatosensory – Somatosensory change blindness for tactile stimuli has been observed, and reveals important information about the distinction from visual change blindness. Auvray et al. (2008) did an experiment on the ability to detect change between two patterns of tactile stimuli presented to fingertips. The experiments presented consecutive patterns which were separated by an empty interval, or by a tactile, visual, or auditory mask. Results showed that performance was impaired when the empty interval was inserted, and even more so when tactile mask was introduced. Changes in tactile displays composed of two or three stimuli with only one distractor in between go unnoticed, while several distractors are needed for visual displays to go unnoticed. These experiments have shown us that our ability to monitor tactile information is affected by more severe limitations than the same ability within the visual modality.

== Practical implications ==
The phenomenon of change blindness has practical implications in the following areas:

=== Eyewitness testimony ===
Research in change blindness has uncovered the possibility of inaccuracy in eyewitness testimony. In many cases, witnesses are rarely able to detect a change in the criminal's identity unless first intending to remember the incident in question. This inability to detect a change in identity can lead to inaccuracy in identifying criminals, mistaken eyewitness identification, and wrongful conviction. Therefore, eyewitness testimonies should be handled with caution in court in order to avoid any of these negative consequences.

=== Driving ability ===
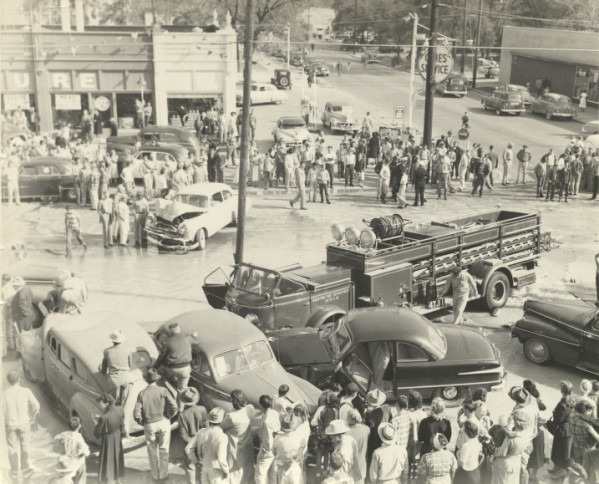
Traffic collision

Older drivers make more incorrect decisions than younger drivers when faced with a change in the scene at an intersection. This can be attributed to the fact that older individuals notice change at a slower rate compared to younger individuals. In addition, the location and relevance of changes have an effect on what is noticed while driving. The reaction time to changes in the driver's peripherals is much slower than the reaction time to changes that occur towards the center of the driver's visual field. Furthermore, drivers are also able to recognize more relevant changes as opposed to irrelevant ones. Research on the effects of change blindness while driving could provide insight into potential explanations of why car accidents occur.

=== Military ===
Military command and control personnel who monitor multiple displays have a delayed time to accurately identify changes due to the necessity of verifying the changes, as well as the effective 'guessing' on some trials. Due to the fact that control personnel have delayed reaction because of change blindness, an interface design of computer work stations may be extremely beneficial to improve the reaction time and accuracy.

== Blindness ==
Change blindness is defined as a misplaced confidence in one's ability to correctly identify visual changes. People are fairly confident in their ability to detect a change, but most people exhibit poor performance on a change blindness task.

=== Factors ===
- Perceived Success – A higher perception of success from previous experience inflates the individual's confidence for success in future experiences.
- Search Time – A longer time spent looking for the visual change creates the impression of poor performance on the task. In other words, a shorter time in identifying a visual change creates the impression of good performance and thus the individual will be overconfident in this ability.

=== Spotlight effect ===
The spotlight effect is a social phenomenon that is defined as an overestimation of the ability of others to notice us. A seemingly obvious change such as another individual changing a sweater during a memory task is rarely noticed. However, the individuals switching the sweater tend to overestimate the ability of the test writers to notice the change in sweaters. In the spotlight effect, this poor performance is a result of the overestimation of others' ability to notice us whereas in change blindness it is the overestimation of others' ability to notice the sweater change. In other words, it is the distinction between noticing differences on a person and noticing differences between any images.

== See also ==
- Attention
- Change deafness
- Inattentional blindness
- Introspection illusion
- Memory
- Motion blindness
- Neuroimaging
- Saccade
- Salience (neuroscience)
- Selective attention
- Spot the difference
- The Invisible Gorilla
- Visual short term memory
