= Introspection illusion =

Cognitive bias

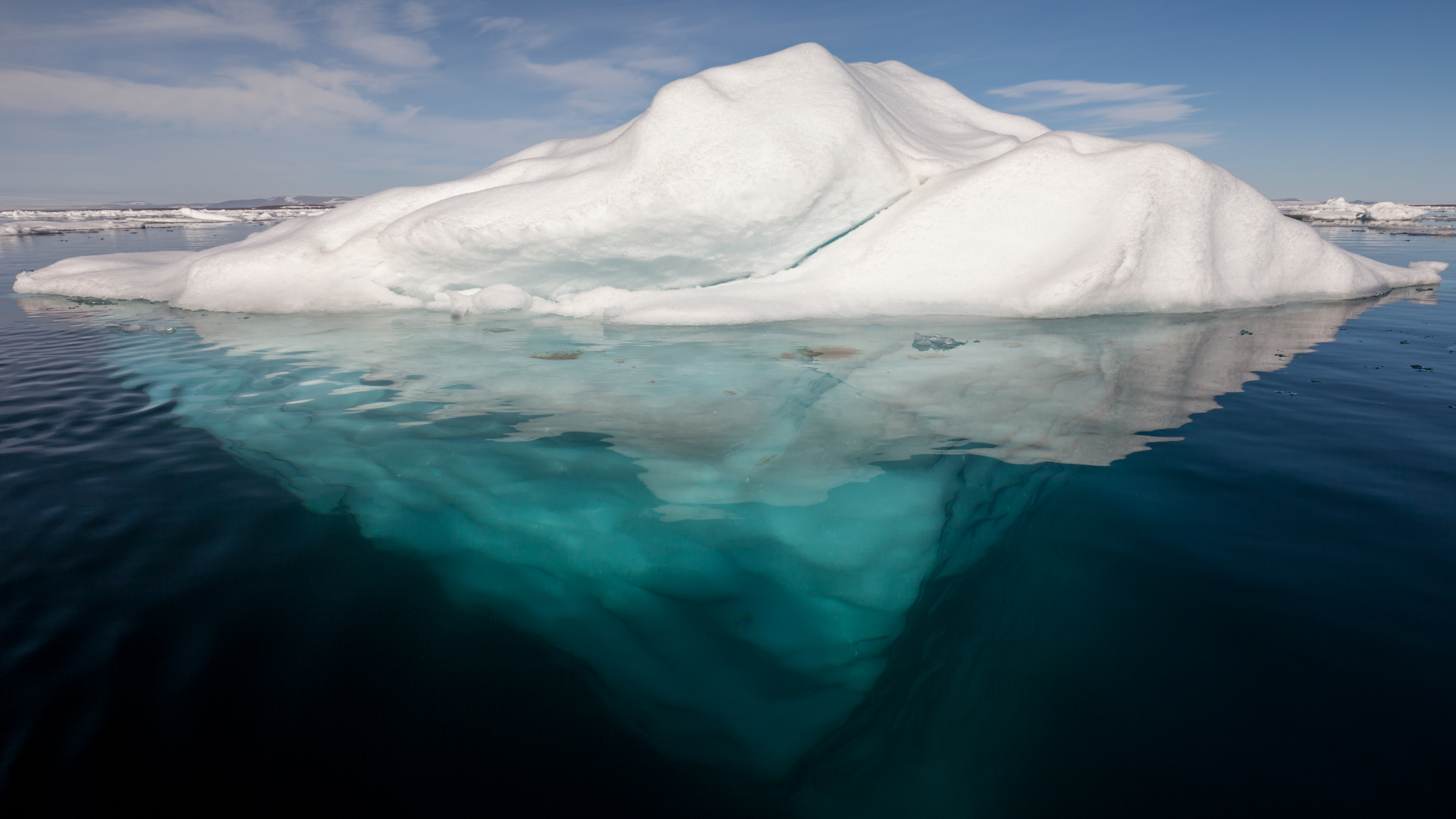
The surface appearance of an iceberg is often used to illustrate the human conscious and unconscious mind; the visible portions are easily noticed, and yet their shape depends on the much larger portions that are out of view.

The introspection illusion is a cognitive bias in which people wrongly think they have direct insight into the origins of their mental states, while treating others' introspections as unreliable. The illusion has been examined in psychological experiments, and suggested as a basis for biases in how people compare themselves to others. These experiments have been interpreted as suggesting that, rather than offering direct access to the processes underlying mental states, introspection is a process of construction and inference, much as people indirectly infer others' mental states from their behaviour.

When people mistake unreliable introspection for genuine self-knowledge, the result can be an illusion of superiority over other people, for example when each person thinks they are less biased and less conformist than the rest of the group. Even when experimental subjects are provided with reports of other subjects' introspections, in as detailed a form as possible, they still rate those other introspections as unreliable while treating their own as reliable. Although the hypothesis of an introspection illusion informs some psychological research, the existing evidence is arguably inadequate to decide how reliable introspection is in normal circumstances.

In certain situations, this illusion leads people to make confident but false explanations of their own behaviour (called "causal theories") or inaccurate predictions of their future mental states.

Correction for the bias may be possible through education about the bias and its unconscious nature.

== Components ==
The phrase "introspection illusion" was coined by Emily Pronin. Pronin describes the illusion as having four components:

1. People give a strong weighting to introspective evidence when assessing themselves.
2. They do not give such a strong weight when assessing others.
3. People disregard their own behaviour when assessing themselves (but not others).
4. Own introspections are more highly weighted than others. It is not just that people lack access to each other's introspections: they regard only their own as reliable.

== Unreliability of introspection ==
[I]ntrospection does not provide a direct pipeline to nonconscious mental processes. Instead, it is best thought of as a process whereby people use the contents of consciousness to construct a personal narrative that may or may not correspond to their nonconscious states.

— Timothy D. Wilson and Elizabeth W. Dunn (2004)

The idea that people can be mistaken about their inner functioning is one applied by eliminative materialists. These philosophers suggest that some concepts, including "belief" or "pain", will turn out to be quite different from what is commonly expected as science advances. The faulty guesses that people make to explain their thought processes have been called "causal theories". The causal theories provided after an action will often serve only to justify the person's behaviour in order to relieve cognitive dissonance. That is, a person may not have noticed the true reasons for their behaviour, even when trying to explain it. The result is an explanation that mostly merely makes themselves feel better. An example might be a man who mistreats others who have a specific quality because he is embarrassed that he himself has that quality. He may not admit this to himself, instead claiming that his prejudice is because he has concluded that the specific quality is bad.

A 1977 paper by psychologists Richard Nisbett and Timothy D. Wilson challenged the directness and reliability of introspection, thereby becoming one of the most cited papers in the science of consciousness. Nisbett and Wilson reported on experiments in which subjects verbally explained why they had a particular preference, or how they arrived at a particular idea. On the basis of these studies and existing attribution research, they concluded that reports on mental processes are confabulated. They wrote that subjects had, "little or no introspective access to higher order cognitive processes". They distinguished between mental contents (such as feelings) and mental processes, arguing that while introspection gives us access to contents, processes remain hidden.

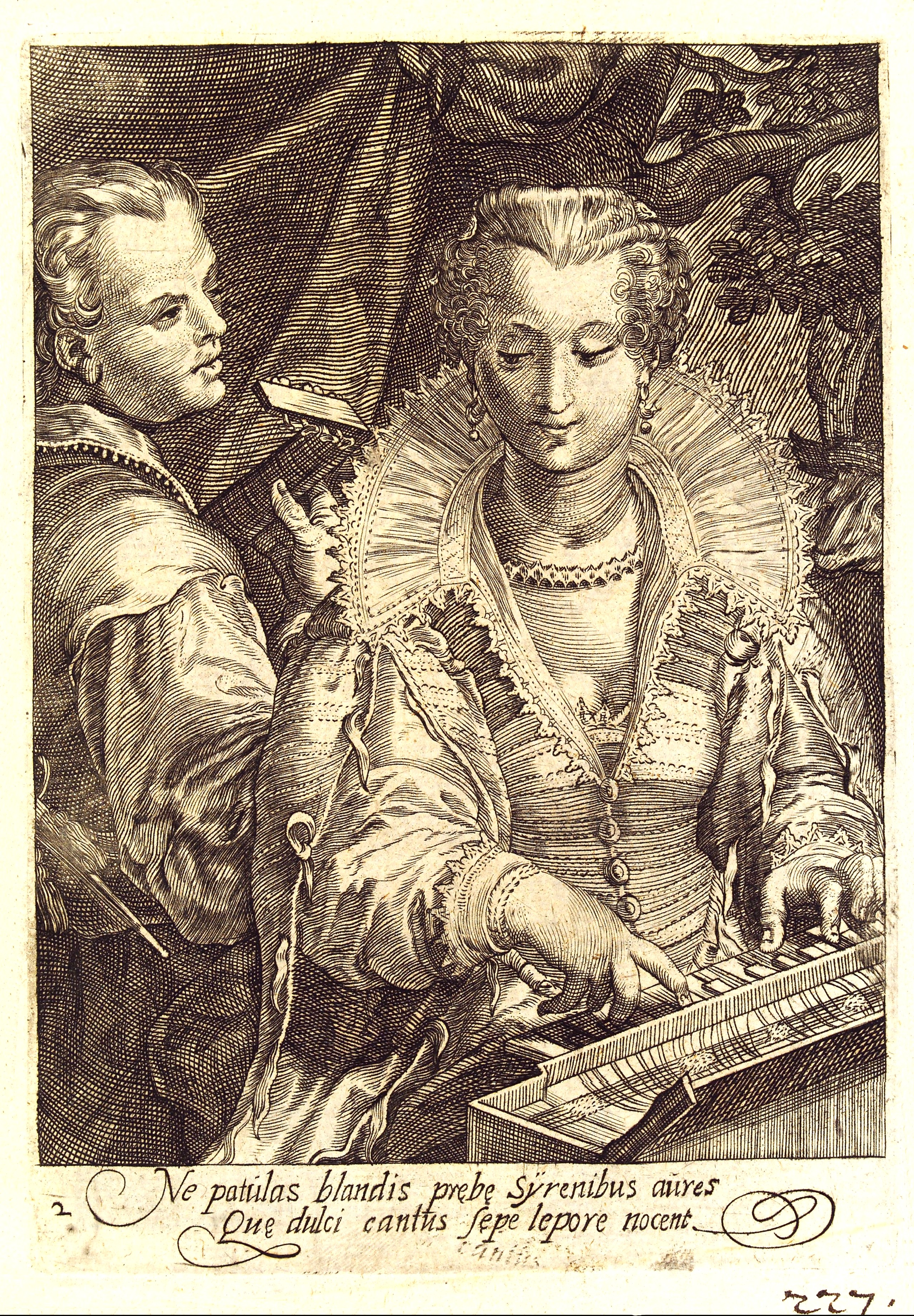
Research continues to find that humans evolved only limited abilities to introspect

Although some other experimental work followed from the Nisbett and Wilson paper, difficulties with testing the hypothesis of introspective access meant that research on the topic generally stagnated. A ten-year-anniversary review of the paper raised several objections, questioning the idea of "process" they had used and arguing that unambiguous tests of introspective access are hard to achieve. Updating the theory in 2002, Wilson admitted that the 1977 claims had been too far-reaching. He instead relied on the theory that the adaptive unconscious does much of the moment-to-moment work of perception and behaviour. When people are asked to report on their mental processes, they cannot access this unconscious activity. However, rather than acknowledge their lack of insight, they confabulate a plausible explanation, and "seem" to be "unaware of their unawareness".

A study conducted by philosopher Eric Schwitzgebel and psychologist Russell T. Hurlburt was set up to measure the extent of introspective accuracy by gathering introspective reports from a single individual who was given the pseudonym "Melanie". Melanie was given a beeper which sounded at random moments, and when it did she had to note what she was currently feeling and thinking. After analyzing the reports the authors had mixed views about the results, the correct interpretation of Melanie's claims and her introspective accuracy. Even after long discussion the two authors disagreed with each other in the closing remarks, Schwitzgebel being pessimistic and Hurlburt optimistic about the reliability of introspection.

=== Factors in accuracy ===
Nisbett and Wilson conjectured about several factors that they found to contribute to the accuracy of introspective self-reports on cognition.

- Availability: Stimuli that are highly salient (either due to recency or being very memorable) are more likely to be recalled and considered for the cause of a response.
- Plausibility: Whether a person finds a stimulus to be a sufficiently likely cause for an effect determines the influence it has on their reporting of the stimulus.
- Removal in time: The greater the distance in time since the occurrence of an event, the less available and more difficult to accurately recall it is.
- Mechanics of judgment: People do not recognize the influence that judgment factors (e.g., position effects) have on them, leading to inaccuracies in self-reporting.
- Context: Focusing on the context of an object distracts from evaluation of that object and can lead people to falsely believe that their thoughts about the object are represented by the context.
- Non-events: The absence of an occurrence is naturally less salient and available than an occurrence itself, leading nonevents to have little influence on reports.
- Nonverbal behaviour: While people receive a large amount of information about others via nonverbal cues, the verbal nature of relaying information and the difficulty of translating nonverbal behaviour into verbal form lead to its lower reporting frequency.
- Discrepancy between the magnitudes of cause and effect: Because it seems natural to assume that a certain size cause will lead to a similarly-sized effect, connections between causes and effects of different magnitudes are not often drawn.

=== Unawareness of error ===
Several hypotheses to explain people's unawareness of their inaccuracies in introspection were provided by Nisbett and Wilson:

- Confusion between content and process: People are usually unable to access the exact process by which they arrived at a conclusion, but can recall an intermediate step prior to the result. However, this step is still content in nature, not a process. The confusion of these discrete forms leads people to believe that they are able to understand their judgment processes. Nisbett and Wilson have been criticized for failing to provide a clear definition of the differences between mental content and mental processes.
- Knowledge of prior idiosyncratic reactions to a stimulus: An individual's belief that they react in an abnormal manner to a stimulus, which would be unpredictable from the standpoint of an outside observer, seems to support true introspective ability. However, these perceived covariations may actually be false, and truly abnormal covariations are rare.
- Differences in causal theories between subcultures: The inherent differences between discrete subcultures necessitates that they have some differing causal theories for any one stimulus. Thus, an outsider would not have the same ability to discern a true cause as would an insider, again making it seem to the introspector that they have the capacity to understand the judgment process better than can another.
- Attentional and intentional knowledge: An individual may consciously know that they were not paying attention to a certain stimulus or did not have a certain intent. Again, as insight that an outside observer does not have, this seems indicative of true introspective ability. However, the authors note that such knowledge can actually mislead the individual in the case that it is not as influential as they may think.
- Inadequate feedback: By nature, introspection is difficult to disconfirm in everyday life, where there are no tests of it and others tend not to question one's introspections. Moreover, when a person's causal theory of reasoning is seemingly disconfirmed, it is easy for them to produce alternative reasons for why the evidence is actually not disconfirmatory at all.
- Motivational reasons: Considering one's own ability to understand their reasoning as being equivalent to an outsider's is intimidating and a threat to the ego and sense of control. Thus, people do not like to entertain the idea, instead maintaining the belief that they can accurately introspect.

=== Criticisms ===
Some evolutionary biologists criticize the claim that confabulation of justifications evolved to relieve cognitive dissonance because it assumes the evolution of a mechanism for feeling dissonance by a lack of justification. These evolutionary biologists argue that if causal theories had no higher predictive accuracy than prejudices that would have been in place even without causal theories, there would be no evolutionary selection for experiencing any form of discomfort from lack of causal theories. The similar claim that the apparent link between homophobia and homosexuality found in the U.S. can be explained by an actual link between homophobia and homosexuality is criticized by many scholars. Since much homophobia in the United States is due to religious indoctrination and therefore unrelated to personal sexual preferences, they argue that the appearance of a link is due to volunteer-biased erotica research in which religious homophobes fear God's judgment but not being recorded as "homosexual" by Earthly psychologists while most non-homophobes are misled by false dichotomies to assume that the notion that men can be sexually fluid is somehow "homophobic" and "unethical".

== Choice blindness ==
Inspired by the Nisbett and Wilson paper, Petter Johansson and colleagues investigated subjects' insight into their own preferences using a new technique. Subjects saw two photographs of people and were asked which they found more attractive. They were given a closer look at their "chosen" photograph and asked to verbally explain their choice. However, in some trials, the experimenter had slipped them the other photograph rather than the one they had chosen, using sleight of hand. A majority of subjects failed to notice that the picture they were looking at did not match the one they had chosen just seconds before. Many subjects confabulated explanations of their preference. For example, a man might say "I preferred this one because I prefer blondes" when he had in fact pointed to the dark-haired woman, but had been handed a blonde. These must have been confabulated because they explain a choice that was never made. The large proportion of subjects who were taken in by the deception contrasts with the 84% who, in post-test interviews, said that hypothetically they would have detected a switch if it had been made in front of them. The researchers coined the phrase "choice blindness" for this failure to detect a mismatch.

A follow-up experiment involved shoppers in a supermarket tasting two different kinds of jam, then verbally explaining their preferred choice while taking further spoonfuls from the "chosen" pot. However, the pots were rigged so that, when explaining their choice, the subjects were tasting the jam they had actually rejected. A similar experiment was conducted with tea. Another variation involved subjects choosing between two objects displayed on PowerPoint slides, then explaining their choice when the description of what they chose had been altered.

Research by Paul Eastwick and Eli Finkel (relationship psychologist) at Northwestern University also undermined the idea that subjects have direct introspective awareness of what attracts them to other people. These researchers examined male and female subjects' reports of what they found attractive. Men typically reported that physical attractiveness was crucial while women identified earning potential as most important. These subjective reports did not predict their actual choices in a speed dating context, or their dating behaviour in a one-month follow-up.

Consistent with choice blindness, Henkel and Mather found that people are easily convinced by false reminders that they chose different options than they actually chose and that they show greater choice-supportive bias in memory for whichever option they believe they chose.

Research by Kamyab Ghorbanpour and Michal Klincewicz at Tilburg University employed an immersive adventure video game to investigate Choice Blindness. Their study demonstrated that virtual environments can be used to induce and measure this phenomenon. The findings indicated that women were more likely than men to detect manipulations of their choices. The research also suggested that individual personality traits and values influence the likelihood of being affected by the choice blindness effect.

=== Criticisms ===
It is not clear, however, the extent to which these findings apply to real-life experience when we have more time to reflect or use actual faces (as opposed to gray-scale photos). As Prof. Kaszniak points out: "although a priori theories are an important component of people's causal explanations, they are not the sole influence, as originally hypothesized by Nisbett & Wilson. Actors also have privileged information access that includes some degree of introspective access to pertinent causal stimuli and thought processes, as well as better access (than observers) to stimulus-response covariation data about their own behaviour". Other criticisms point out that people who volunteer to psychology lab studies are not representative of the general population and also are behaving in ways that do not reflect how they would behave in real life. Examples include people of many different non-open political ideologies, despite their enmity to each other, having a shared belief that it is "ethical" to give an appearance of humans justifying beliefs and "unethical" to admit that humans are open-minded in the absence of threats that inhibit critical thinking, making them fake justifications.

== Attitude change ==
Studies that ask participants to introspect upon their reasoning (for liking, choosing, or believing something, etc.) tend to see a subsequent decrease in correspondence between attitude and behaviour in the participants. For example, in a study by Wilson et al., participants rated their interest in puzzles that they had been given. Prior to rating, one group had been instructed to contemplate and write down their reasons for liking or disliking the puzzles, while the control group was given no such task. The amount of time participants spent playing with each puzzle was then recorded. The correlation between ratings of and time spent playing each puzzle was much smaller for the introspection group than the control group.

A subsequent study was performed to show the generalizability of these results to more "realistic" circumstances. In this study, participants were all involved in a steady romantic relationship. All were asked to rate how well-adjusted their relationship was. One group was beforehand asked to list all of the reasons behind their feelings for their partner, while the control group did not do so. Six months later, the experimenters followed up with participants to check if they were still in the same relationship. Those who had been asked to introspect showed much less attitude-behaviour consistency based upon correlations between earlier relationship ratings and whether they were still dating their partners. This shows that introspection was not predictive, but this also probably means that the introspection has changed the evolution of the relationship.

The authors theorize that these effects are due to participants changing their attitudes, when confronted with a need for justification, without changing their corresponding behaviours. The authors hypothesize that this attitude shift is the result of a combination of things: a desire to avoid feeling foolish for simply not knowing why one feels a certain way; a tendency to make justifications based upon cognitive reasons, despite the large influence of emotion; ignorance of mental biases (e.g., halo effects); and self-persuasion that the reasons one has come up with must be representative with their attitude. In effect, people attempt to supply a "good story" to explain their reasoning, which often leads to convincing themselves that they actually hold a different belief. In studies wherein participants chose an item to keep, their subsequent reports of satisfaction with the item decreased, suggesting that their attitude changes were temporary, returning to the original attitude over time.

=== Introspection by focusing on feelings ===
In contrast with introspection by focusing on reasoning, that which instructs one to focus on their feelings has actually been shown to increase attitude-behaviour correlations. This finding suggests that introspecting on one's feelings is not a maladaptive process.

=== Criticisms ===
The theory that justificatory mental processes do not make behaviour more adaptive is criticized by some biologists, who argue that the cost in nutrients for brain function selects against any brain mechanism that does not make behaviour more adapted to the environment. They argue that the cost in essential nutrients causes even more difficulty than the cost in calories, especially in social groups of many individuals needing the same scarce nutrients, which imposes substantial difficulty on feeding the group and lowers their potential size. These biologists argue that the evolution of argumentation was driven by the effectiveness of arguments on changing risk perception attitudes and life and death decisions to a more adaptive state, as "luxury functions" that did not enhance life and death survival would lose the evolutionary "tug of war" against the selection for nutritional thrift. While there have been claims of non-adaptive brain functions being selected by sexual selection, these biologists criticize any applicability to introspection illusion's causal theories because sexually selected traits are most disabling as a fitness signal during or after puberty but human brains require the highest amount of nutrients before puberty (enhancing the nerve connections in ways that make adult brains capable of faster and more nutrient-efficient firing).

== A priori causal theories ==
In their classic paper, Nisbett and Wilson proposed that introspective confabulations result from a priori theories, of which they put forth four possible origins:

- Explicit cultural rules (e.g., stopping at red traffic lights)
- Implicit cultural theories, with certain schemata for likely stimulus-response relationships (e.g., an athlete only endorses a brand because he is paid to do so)
- Individual observational experiences that lead one to form a theory of covariation (e.g. "I feel nervous. I always get nervous when I have to talk at meetings!")
- Similar connotation between stimulus and response

The authors note that the use of these theories does not necessarily lead to inaccurate assumptions, but that this frequently occurs because the theories are improperly applied.

== Explaining biases ==
Pronin argues that over-reliance on intentions is a factor in a number of different biases. For example, by focusing on their current good intentions, people can overestimate their likelihood of behaving virtuously.

=== In perceptions of bias ===
The bias blind spot is an established phenomenon that people rate themselves as less susceptible to bias than their peer group. Emily Pronin and Matthew Kugler argue that this phenomenon is due to the introspection illusion. Pronin and Kugler's interpretation is that when people decide whether someone else is biased, they use overt behaviour. On the other hand, when assessing whether or not they themselves are biased, people look inward, searching their own thoughts and feelings for biased motives. Since biases operate unconsciously, these introspections are not informative, but people wrongly treat them as reliable indication that they themselves, unlike other people, are immune to bias.

In their experiments, subjects had to make judgments about themselves and about other subjects. They displayed standard biases, for example rating themselves above the others on desirable qualities (demonstrating illusory superiority). The experimenters explained cognitive bias, and asked the subjects how it might have affected their judgment. The subjects rated themselves as less susceptible to bias than others in the experiment (confirming the bias blind spot). When they had to explain their judgments, they used different strategies for assessing their own and others' bias.

Pronin and Kugler tried to give their subjects access to others' introspections. To do this, they made audio recordings of subjects who had been told to say whatever came into their heads as they decided whether their answer to a previous question might have been affected by bias. Although subjects persuaded themselves they were unlikely to be biased, their introspective reports did not sway the assessments of observers.

When asked what it would mean to be biased, subjects were more likely to define bias in terms of introspected thoughts and motives when it applied to themselves, but in terms of overt behaviour when it applied to other people. When subjects were explicitly told to avoid relying on introspection, their assessments of their own bias became more realistic.

Additionally, Nisbett and Wilson found that asking participants whether biases (such as the position effect in the stocking study) had an effect on their decisions resulted in a negative response, in contradiction with the data.

=== In perceptions of conformity ===
Another series of studies by Pronin and colleagues examined perceptions of conformity. Subjects reported being more immune to social conformity than their peers. In effect, they saw themselves as being "alone in a crowd of sheep". The introspection illusion appeared to contribute to this effect. When deciding whether others respond to social influence, subjects mainly looked at their behaviour, for example explaining other student's political opinions in terms of following the group. When assessing their own conformity, subjects treat their own introspections as reliable. In their own minds, they found no motive to conform, and so decided that they had not been influenced.

=== In perceptions of control and free will ===
Psychologist Daniel Wegner has argued that an introspection illusion contributes to belief in paranormal phenomena such as psychokinesis. He observes that in everyday experience, intention (such as wanting to turn on a light) is followed by action (such as flicking a light switch) in a reliable way, but the processes connecting the two are not consciously accessible. Hence though subjects may feel that they directly introspect their own free will, the experience of control is actually inferred from relations between the thought and the action. This theory, called "apparent mental causation", acknowledges the influence of David Hume's view of the mind. This process for detecting when one is responsible for an action is not totally reliable, and when it goes wrong there can be an illusion of control. This could happen when an external event follows, and is congruent with, a thought in someone's mind, without an actual causal link.

As evidence, Wegner cites a series of experiments on magical thinking in which subjects were induced to think they had influenced external events. In one experiment, subjects watched a basketball player taking a series of free throws. When they were instructed to visualise him making his shots, they felt that they had contributed to his success.

If the introspection illusion contributes to the subjective feeling of free will, then it follows that people will more readily attribute free will to themselves rather than others. This prediction has been confirmed by three of Pronin and Kugler's experiments. When college students were asked about personal decisions in their own and their roommate's lives, they regarded their own choices as less predictable. Staff at a restaurant described their co-workers' lives as more determined (having fewer future possibilities) than their own lives. When weighing up the influence of different factors on behaviour, students gave desires and intentions the strongest weight for their own behaviour, but rated personality traits as most predictive of other people. Because they were evaluating roommates, participants gave these evaluations in a situation when they were probably rather familiar with the other individual.

However, criticism of Wegner's claims regarding the significance of introspection illusion for the notion of free will has been published.

=== Criticisms ===
Research shows that human volunteers can estimate their response times accurately, in fact knowing their "mental processes" well, but only with substantial demands made on their attention and cognitive resources (i.e. they are distracted while estimating). Such estimation is likely more than post hoc interpretation and may incorporate privileged information. Mindfulness training can also increase introspective accuracy in some instances. Nisbett and Wilson's findings were criticized by psychologists Ericsson and Simon, among others.

== Correction ==
A study that investigated the effect of educating people about unconscious biases on their subsequent self-ratings of susceptibility to bias showed that those who were educated did not exhibit the bias blind spot, in contrast with the control group. This finding provides hope that being informed about unconscious biases such as the introspection illusion may help people to avoid making biased judgments, or at least make them aware that they are biased. Findings from other studies on correction of the bias yielded mixed results. In a later review of the introspection illusion, Pronin suggests that the distinction is that studies that merely provide a warning of unconscious biases will not see a correction effect, whereas those that inform about the bias and emphasize its unconscious nature do yield corrections. Thus, knowledge that bias can operate during conscious awareness seems the defining factor in leading people to correct for it.

Timothy Wilson has tried to find a way out from "introspection illusion", recounted in his book Strangers to Ourselves. He suggests that the observation of our own behaviours more than our thoughts can be one of the keys for clearer introspective knowledge.

=== Criticisms ===
Some 21st century critical rationalists argue that claims of correcting for introspection illusions or other cognitive biases pose a threat of immunizing themselves to criticism by alleging that criticism of psychological theories that claim cognitive bias are "justifications" for cognitive bias, making it non-falsifiable by labelling of critics and also potentially totalitarian. These modern critical rationalists argue that defending a theory by claiming that it overcomes bias and alleging that critics are biased, can defend any pseudoscience from criticism; and that the claim that "criticism of A is a defense of B" is inherently incapable of being evidence-based, and that any actual "most humans" bias (if it existed) would be shared by most psychologists thus make psychological claims of biases a way of accusing unbiased criticism of being biased and marketing the biases as overcoming of bias.

== See also ==
- Attitude behavior consistency
- Choice theory
- Change blindness
- List of cognitive biases
- Self-deception
- Self-perception theory

== Sources ==
- Pronin, Emily (2009). "The Introspection Illusion". In Mark P. Zanna (ed.). Advances in Experimental Social Psychology. Vol. 41. Academic Press. pp. 1–67. doi:10.1016/S0065-2601(08)00401-2. ISBN 978-0-12-374472-2.
- Wilson, Timothy D. (2002). Strangers to ourselves: discovering the adaptive unconscious. Belknap Press of Harvard University Press. ISBN 978-0-674-00936-3.
