= Binocular Switch Suppression =

Technique in visual and cognitive research

Binocular switch suppression (BSS) is a technique to suppress usually salient images from an individual's awareness, a type of experimental manipulation used in visual perception and cognitive neuroscience. In BSS, two images of differing signal strengths are repetitively switched between the left and right eye at a constant rate of 1 Hertz. During this process of switching, the image of lower contrast and signal strength is perceptually suppressed for a period of time.

Other techniques for such manipulation include binocular rivalry, continuous flash suppression (CFS), visual masking and flicker switch suppression. Similar to binocular rivalry and CFS, BSS works by controlling the signal strength of each respective stimulus and also by managing neural adaption. However, BSS is able to achieve better quality perceptual suppression and longer suppression periods than these other tools. Moreover, unlike other methods, BSS allows one to investigate the neural and behavioural consequences during the period of visual suppression itself and not just after the presentation of the target stimuli.

== Concepts ==
=== Signal strength ===
Signal strength plays an important role in the literature of binocular rivalry and visual suppression. Similarly in BSS, it is one of the factors that determine which stimulus gets suppressed perceptually. It is a multidimensional construct that is related to the stimulus' properties. These factors determine signal strength and numerous researchers have proposed the following parameters: luminance contrast, density, colour contrast and spatial frequency content. An image with weaker signal strength is more likely to be suppressed when both eyes are provided with conflicting images of differing signal strength. For example, an image with lower contrast is expected to be suppressed and suppressed for longer periods of time than one with higher contrast. A blurred image is more likely to be suppressed perceptually as opposed to a better focused one.

Rivalry dominance and perceptual suppression is also expected to be greater when the difference in signal strength is greater.

It is conceptualised that increasing signal strength of an image shown to one particular eye will increase the probability of perceptual dominance of the stimulus and this dominance is likely to last for prolonged periods of time. As such, manipulating signal strength can enable one to control perceptual dominance and also perceptual suppression during binocular rivalry and BSS.

=== Neural adaptation ===
Neural adaptation occurs when one is exposed to a particular visual stimulus for prolonged periods of time. When this phenomenon occurs, the stimulus will gradually 'fade' away visually. It is suggested that this occurrence is due to the reduction in firing rates and reduction in sensitivity of the particular neurons responding to that particular stimulus over time.

Neural adaptation is said to be prevalent in early and late stages of visual processing and it can occur for tens of milliseconds or even up to several seconds. It plays a fundamental role in sensory information processing and is important in perceptual suppression. In the context of contrast adaptation, neural adaption to a high-contrast stimulus results in a reduction in perceived contrast of the stimulus. Recordings of the primary visual cortex during contrast adaptation showed that it is the predominance of contrast sensitivity reduction that results in this adaptation.

Neural adaptation can affect the relative strength of the visual stimuli and can affect perceptual suppression in events such as binocular rivalry. Several research have shown that manipulating neural adaption can allow one to control perceptual dominance during binocular rivalry; rivalry dominance durations are longer in situations where neural adaptation is minimal.

As such, mitigation of neural adaptation is required to ensure better quality and longer perceptual dominance and perceptual suppression. There are several ways to minimise neural adaptation and one of it is to induce motion to reduce or prevent neural adaption from occurring. Movement can be introduced either to the stimuli itself or to the eye through small eye movements during fixation to prevent or reduce loss of vision at the retinal receptors.

== How does binocular switch suppression work? ==
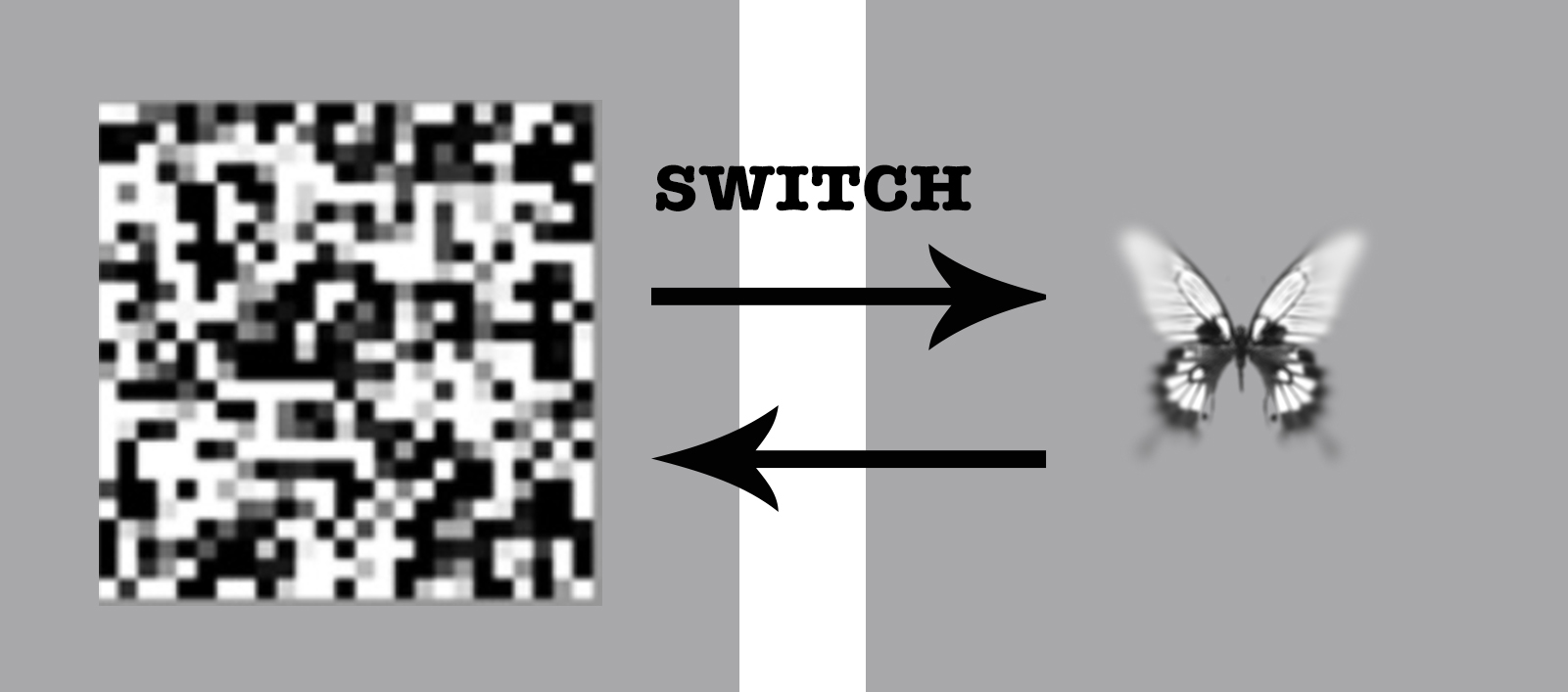
Figure 1: Image adapted from stimuli of Arnold et al. (2008)'s experiment

In the paper written by Arnold et al., (2008), they introduced this method called "Binocular Switch Suppression" where conflicting images of differing contrast (Figure 1) are repeatedly switched between the left and right eye at a predetermined constant rate. This switching aims to diminish or reduce adaptation of the monocular neurons and cells such as the retinal ganglion cells at early stages of visual processing. To manipulate signal strength of the stimuli, random white noise patterns which are used to suppress the target grayscale image are designed to have higher signal strength, higher contrast, and higher spatial frequency content.

In line with the current literature, with control over signal strength of the stimulus and proper management of neural adaptation, it is predicted that a stronger visual stimulus (random white noise pattern) should predictably dominate perception and the weaker visual stimulus (target grayscale image) would be suppressed.

Arnold et al. (2008) attempted to validate this method of perceptual suppression by exploring its optimal switch rate, strength of suppression and the duration as to how long images can be suppressed from consciousness using BSS.

=== Optimal switch rate for BSS ===
In Experiment 1 of Arnold et al., (2008), a white noise pattern and a target image switched between both eyes at selected constant rates. To test for optimal rates of BSS, images were switched between the both eyes at speeds ranging from 0.5 - 15 Hertz and the degree of suppression was measured. Participants were asked to indicate their response when they detect any part of the target image. Results showed that the optimal switch rates for BSS was of 1 Hertz and this is the rate which suppression was the longest.

=== Duration of suppression ===
It was suggested that on average, BSS is able to suppress images for 24 seconds (SD = 2.6). On the other hand, CFS managed to suppress images for a slightly shorter period of time of an average of 19.3 seconds (SD = 3.9). BSS' ability to induce suppression for a sustained period of time is promising and could be employed in the study of conscious, subconscious and non-conscious processing of visual stimulus.

== Relationship with binocular rivalry ==
Binocular rivalry is an occurrence whereby visual perception switches between two eyes when different images are present to each eye. At each point of time, there is a random chance that perceptual dominance will occur at any of the eyes. Switches in perceptual dominance and perceptual suppression in each eye can also occur randomly from time to time. It has been suggested that during binocular rivalry, it is challenging to predict durations of dominance and suppression due to stochastic perceptual states.

Subsequently, flash suppression and Continuous Flash Suppression were suggested as superior methods that can enhance the benefits and minimise the limitations of binocular rivalry. One of the limitations that is associated with binocular rivalry in exploring neural mechanisms of awareness is that perceptual dominance and suppression is only sustained for an unpredictably short period of time. BSS has demonstrated the ability to achieve longer duration of suppression than binocular rivalry. As such, it is plausible that BSS could be a better tool in exploring visual processing outside of awareness.

== Relationship with continuous flash suppression ==
Continuous flash suppression (CFS), a technique which was developed by Tsuchiya and Koch in 2005, combined the effectiveness of binocular rivalry and flash suppression to minimise the randomness in rivalry during visual perception and suppression. In a typical CFS trial, the participants are shown two contrasting images, one to each eye and the image of greater signal strength will flash at a constant rate (7-10 Hertz). The target image will be shown to the other eye. Unlike Binocular Switch Suppression (BSS), the target image will remain stationary at the same spot on the screen and will not switch nor flash during the presentation period.

To validate and prove BSS effectiveness in rendering usually salient images 'invisible', Arnold et al. (2008) contrasted BSS's performance with CFS', which is regarded as one of the best existing methods in suppressing usually salient images from awareness in the current literature. Results suggest that BSS has the ability to achieve longer duration of suppression and better suppression quality than CFS. In addition, BSS has an optimal rate in suppression of 1 Hertz, while CFS has an optimal rate of 7 Hertz. This difference in optimal frequency in suppressing target images has been suggested to be a resultant of different neural mechanisms behind the suppression effects of these two methods. However, more investigation is required to analyse what these differences are and how these mechanisms differ from one another.

== Future directions ==
As of now, there has not been any other research that investigate the effectiveness of Binocular Switch Suppression in visual suppression. More rigorous research needs to be done to validate this new way of visual suppression and to supplement this research by Arnold et al. (2008). If this approach is found to be indeed effective and reliable, it could be put into practical use in the research of conscious, subconscious and non-conscious visual processing.

== See also ==
- Binocular rivalry
- Flash suppression
- Continuous flash suppression
