= Feud (professional wrestling) =

Staged rivalry between wrestlers in professional wrestling

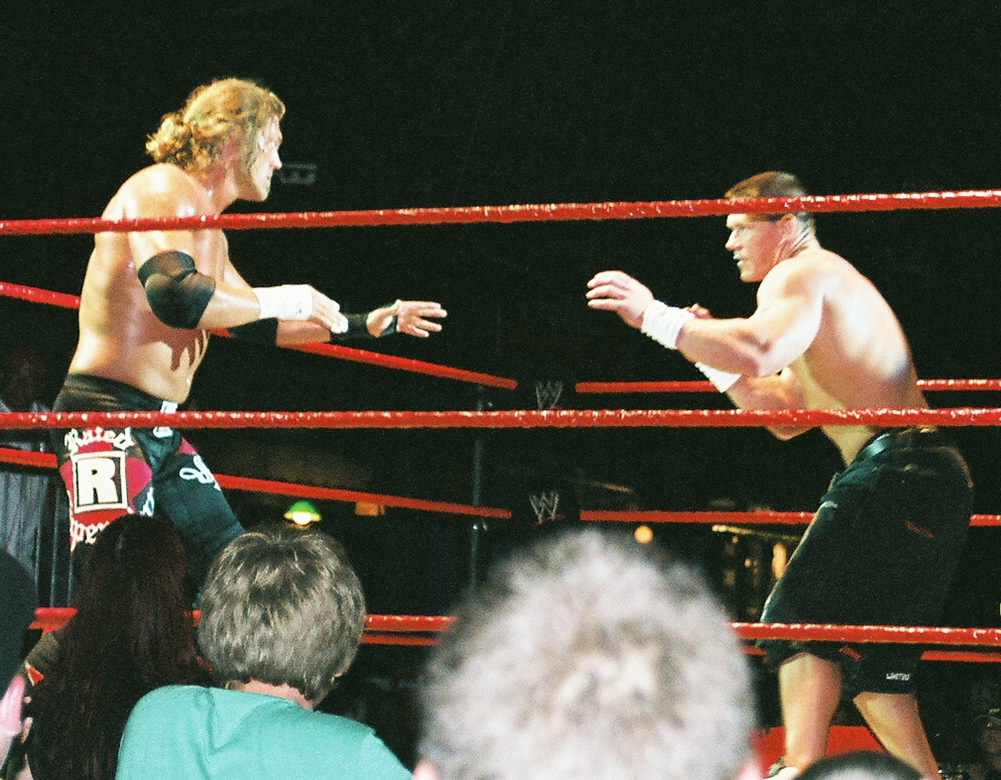
Edge facing off against John Cena during their 2006 feud in WWE

In professional wrestling, a feud is a staged rivalry between multiple wrestlers or groups of wrestlers. They are integrated into ongoing storylines, particularly in events which are televised. Feuds may last for months or even years; conversely, they may be resolved with implausible speed, perhaps during a single match.

== Definition ==
Feuds are often the result of the friction that is created between faces (the heroic figures) and heels (the malevolent, "evil" participants). Common causes of feuds are a purported slight or insult, although they can be based on many other things, including conflicting moral codes or simple professional one-upmanship such as the pursuit of a championship. Some of the more popular feuds with audiences involve pitting former allies, particularly tag team partners, against each other. Depending on how popular and entertaining the feud may be, it is usually common practice for a feud to continue on for weeks, usually building toward a match in a supercard.

Due to the complexity of modern wrestling storylines, some feuds lack the traditional 'face vs. heel' narrative. Many feuds take place between two faces, while some involve characters that don't fit either traditional role, often called tweeners. Feuds between two heels are rare, but may take place, especially if one or more of the wrestlers in the feud are particularly popular with fans.

One of the longest feuds of all time was the feud between Ric Flair and Ricky Steamboat, estimated by Flair to comprise more than 2,000 matches, though he admits that most of those matches were "confined to those in the arena". Traditionally, most wrestling promoters wanted to "protect the business" by having wrestlers act in character in public, and thus further convince the live audience that the feuding wrestlers really hated each other and were looking to outdo each other. During the days when wrestling territories were more regionally based, some feuds lasted for years, and if the feuding wrestlers were shown to really be friends, or were associating as friends in public, it would break the illusion of their feud, and undo all the work to promote it up to that point.

== See also ==
- Angle (professional wrestling)
- Glossary of professional wrestling terms
- Kayfabe
- Shoot (professional wrestling)
- Work (professional wrestling)
