= Continuous flash suppression =

Continuous flash suppression (CFS) is an adapted version of the original flash suppression method, first reported in 2004. In CFS, the first eye is presented with a static stimulus, such as a schematic face, while the second eye is presented with a series of rapidly changing stimuli. The result is the static stimulus becomes consciously repressed by the stimuli presented in the second eye. A variant of CFS to suppress a dynamic stimulus has also been reported.

CFS not only successfully suppresses images, but it strengthens the depth and duration of suppression compared to previous methods, such as flash suppression and binocular rivalry. CFS has the highest magnitude of suppression and allows researchers to increase the suppression time of an image tenfold. Using this method, subjects may report an image presented in their visual field as being invisible for over three minutes. CFS has the longest suppression time compared to other methods. CFS opens the door to studying preconscious processing mechanisms involved in visual perception.

== Applications ==
CFS can be used to measure the salience of an image. Using this application, CFS can assist in determining if emotionally salient faces have a shorter suppression time compared to neutral faces. Significant differences have been shown in suppression duration depending on the images being suppressed. This illustrates how CFS can be used to more accurately measure the varying strength and perceptual influence of individual visual stimuli.

Continuous flash suppression is a useful method for psychologists and neuroscientists interested in studying the mechanisms of conscious and nonconscious visual processing. Whereas other visual illusions that render otherwise salient images invisible have their own shortcomings and advantages, continuous flash suppression has a number of advantages for wiping images from conscious vision. It can erase an image presented at the fovea (which usually is much more resistant to perceptual suppression, unlike, for example, crowding), in every trial (unlike binocular rivalry), for a longer duration (>1 sec, unlike backward masking), with an excellent control of timing (unlike binocular rivalry). It has been widely exploited to tackle the scope and limits of unconscious processing.

== Methodology ==
Tsuchiya and Koch (2006) argue that CFS is not simply a stronger form of binocular rivalry, but is actually a continuous form of flash suppression. The succession of multiple flashes that give CFS its increased suppression capabilities. The duration of stimulus suppression is chiefly dependent on the flash rate of the stimulus. Studies conclude that a series of five stimuli flashes in CFS achieve the full depth of suppression. A unique feature of CFS is its immunity to adaptation. Because the stimulus is flashed repeatedly, CFS prevents the subject from achieving actual conscious awareness of the stimulus.

=== Mondrian patterns ===
Mondrian patterns are typically used when conducting CFS experiments. Each pattern is generally flashed for 0.1 seconds before being replaced by a different Mondrian image. The typical Mondrian pattern used in CFS is composed of many varied black/grey/white or sometimes multi-colored squares. These Mondrian-scenes act as the suppressors of the probe stimulus. The name comes from Piet Mondrian, an artist who was famous for his use of vertical and horizontal lines.

== See also ==
- Flash suppression
