= Motion-induced blindness =

Optical illusion

In this demonstration the observer focuses at the flickering green dot in the middle. After about 10 seconds, the observer sees one, two or all three of the static yellow dots arranged at the corners of an imaginary equilateral triangle disappear and then reappear. Sometimes the observer sees these two dots moving. These disappearances and reappearances continue pseudo-randomly for as long as the observer cares to look.

Motion Induced Blindness (MIB), also known as Bonneh's illusion, is a visual illusion in which a large, continuously moving pattern erases from perception some small, continuously presented, stationary dots when one looks steadily at the center of the display. It was discovered by Bonneh, Cooperman, and Sagi (2001), who used a swarm of blue dots moving on a virtual sphere as the larger pattern and three small yellow dots as the smaller pattern. They found that after about 10 seconds, one or more of the dots disappeared for brief, random times.

The illustrated version is a reproduction of an MIB display used by Michael Bach (2002). Bach replaced the 3D swarm of blue dots with a flat, rotating matrix of blue crosses and added a central, green, flashing dot for people to keep their eyes on. This produces robust disappearances of the yellow dots.

Bonneh et al. attributed the causes of the illusion to attentional mechanisms, arguing that the visual system operates in a winner-takes-all manner.

== Related illusions ==
Disappearances of easily visible, stationary patterns presented to one eye can happen when a different pattern is presented to the other eye—binocular rivalry, discovered in 1593. This also happens when the other eye's pattern is moving.

Similar, but weaker disappearances happen when the two patterns are both presented to one or to both eyes—monocular rivalry, discovered in 1898. Moreover, easily visible stationary patterns that are away from where one looks can disappear with steady fixation—Troxler's fading, discovered in 1804. Other related illusions are flash suppression and motion-induced interocular suppression.

== Causes ==
=== Interhemispheric Switch ===
There is a correlation between an individual's switch rate during binocular rivalry and the rate of disappearance and reappearance in MIB in the same individual. This is most evident when the investigation involves an adequate sample from the 8-10X range of switch rates in the human population. In addition, TMS, Transcranial Magnetic Stimulation interruption of the MIB cycle is specific jointly, for both the hemisphere receiving the TMS pulse and the phase of the MIB cycle, with the disappearance phase susceptible to interruption via Left hemisphere TMS and the reappearance phase susceptible to Right hemisphere interruption. In this way, MIB is like binocular rivalry, where hemispheric manipulations using caloric vestibular stimulation (or TMS) also require the correct combination of cerebral hemisphere and phase (1/4 possibilities).

From these observations, it can be argued that MIB is an interhemispheric switching phenomenon, an unexpected member of the class of rhythmic, biphasic, perceptual rivalries such as binocular rivalry and plaid motion rivalry. In this formulation, the disappearance in MIB can be understood in terms of the cognitive style of the Left hemisphere, which chooses a single possibility from the many, and ignores or "denies" the others (denial being one of the characteristic defence mechanisms of the Left, which becomes exaggerated in the Left hemisphere bias of mania). MIB reappearance is attributable to the Right hemisphere, whose "discrepancy detector" cognitive style assesses all possibilities, and therefore disagrees with the biased decision to ignore the bright yellow stimulus. A corollary of this formulation is a predictable connection between MIB and mood, which was successfully tested on thousands of viewers watching ABC TV's Catalyst Program in Australia, where longer disappearance phases were observed in euphoric individuals and very short, or absent, disappearances were a feature of the dysphoria of stress, trauma and depression.

=== Surface completion ===
Numerous psychophysical findings emphasize the importance of surface completion and depth cues in visual perception. Thus, if MIB is affected by these factors it will regulate in accordance to simple occlusion principles. In their study, Graf et al. (2002) stereoscopically presented a moving grid stimulus set behind, in front of, or in the same plane as the static dots. They then showed involuntary completion of the grid elements into a surface interacting with the static targets - creating an illusion of occlusion. When the grid appeared in front of the targets the proportion of disappearance was larger than when it was behind or on the same plane. Although to a lesser extent, MIB did nonetheless occur in the conditions where the perceptual occlusion was not taking place (targets were in front of the mask).

The effect of interposition and perceived depth on target disappearance in MIB was also shown in a study done by Hsu et al. (2010) where a concave target appearing behind its surrounding disappeared more frequently than a convex one appearing in front of the mask. These effects, albeit being less significant, were replicated in similar settings without the use of motion.

The above experiments show that surface completion and simple occlusion precepts can predictably modulate MIB. However. they do not explain the origin of MIB, and may only be evoking other processes contingent upon it. Moreover, the surface completion theory does not explain the role of motion in this phenomenon.

=== Perceptual filling-in ===
Hsu et al. (2004) compared MIB to a similar phenomenon of perceptual filling-in (PFI), which likewise reveals a striking dissociation between the percept and the sensory input. They describe both as visual attributes which are perceived in a certain region of the visual field regardless of being in the background (in the same manner as colour, brightness or texture) thus inducing target disappearance. They argue that because in both MIB and PFI the disappearance, or the incorporation of the background motion stimuli, becomes more profound with an increase in eccentricity, with a decrease in contrast, and when perceptual grouping with other stimuli is controlled for. The two illusions are very likely to be a result of intermutual processes. Since MBI and PFI show to be structurally similar, it seems plausible that MIB can be a phenomenon responsible for completing missing information across the blind spot and scotomas where motion is involved.

=== Motion streak suppression ===
Rather than a deficiency of our visual processing, MIB may be a functional side effect of the visual system's attempt to facilitate a better perception of movement. Wallis and Arnold (2009) propose a plausible explanation of target disappearance in MIB by linking it to the processes responsible for motion streak suppression. In their view, target disappearance is a side effect of our vision's attempt to provide an apparent perception of moving form. MIB shows to be hindered at equiluminance and augmented at the trailing edges of movement, all reminiscent of motion streak suppression. It appears that what drives MIB is a competition between a neural signal sensitive to spatiotemporal luminance and one responding to proximate stationary targets; where the stronger signal eventuates with what we actually perceive at any given moment (Donner et al., 2008).

=== Perceptual scotoma ===
A different explanatory approach by New and Scholl (2008) proposes that the phenomenon is another instance of our visual system's endeavor to provide clear and accurate perception. Because the static targets appear to be invariant with respect to the background motion, the visual system removes them from our awareness, discarding it as being contrary to the logic of perception and real life situations; thus treating it as a piece of disaffiliated retina or a scotoma. Consistent with this account is the fact that targets which are stabilized on the retina are more likely to be induced to disappearance than the ones moving across the retina.

== Implications ==
MIB may reveal the mechanisms underlying our visual perception.

Researchers have speculated about whether MIB occurs outside the laboratory, without being noticed. Situations such as driving, in which some night drivers should see stationary red tail lights of the preceding cars disappear temporally when they attend to the moving stream of lights from oncoming traffic may be case points.

== See also ==
- Binocular rivalry
- Flash suppression
- Monocular rivalry
- Motion-induced interocular suppression
- Troxler's fading
- Visual perception
