= Rivalry =

Competitive situation

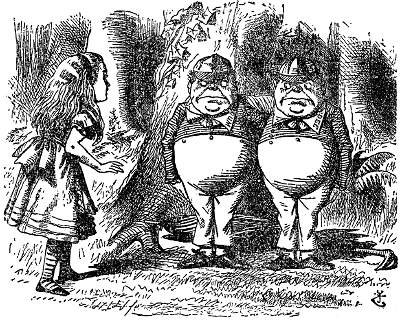
Tweedledum and Tweedledee, fictional rivals from Lewis Carroll's Through the Looking-Glass.

A rivalry is the state of two people or groups engaging in a lasting competitive relationship. Rivalry is the "against each other" spirit between two competing sides. The relationship itself may also be called "a rivalry", and each participant or side a rival to the other. Someone's main rival may be called an archrival. A rivalry can be defined as "a perceptual categorizing process in which actors identify which states are threatening competitors". In order for the rivalry to persist, rather than resulting in perpetual dominance by one side, it must be "a competitive relationship among equals". Political scientist John A. Vasquez has asserted that equality of power is a necessary component for a true rivalry to exist, but others have disputed that element.

Rivalries traverse many different fields within society and "abound at all levels of human interaction", often existing between friends, firms, sports teams, schools, and universities. Moreover, "families, politicians, political parties, ethnic groups, regional sections of countries, and states all engage in enduring rivalries of varying length and intensity". Rivalries develop from the product of competition and ritualism between different parties. In some cases, rivalry can become "so consuming that actors worry only about whether their actions will harm or benefit their rivals".

== Origin and meaning ==
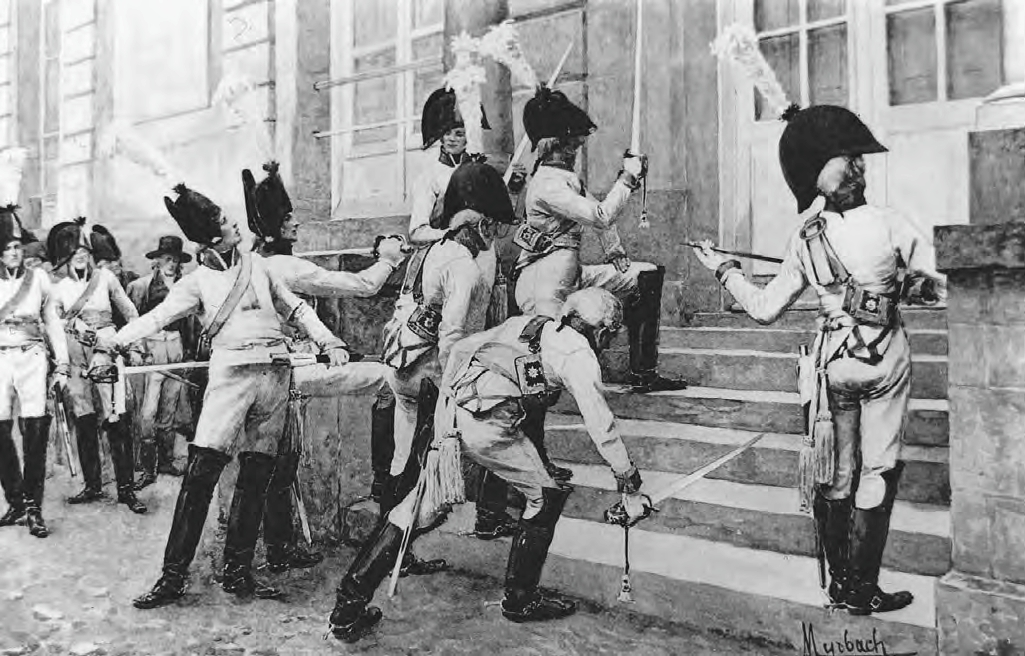
Rivalry between France and Germany has existed as long as the two nations states have; here, officers from the Prussian Gardes du Corps, wishing to provoke war, sharpen their swords on the steps of the French embassy in Berlin in the autumn of 1806.

A rivalry generally refers to competition between people or groups, where each strives to be more successful than the other. (Note: At least one source contended that although commonly two-sided, a rivalry may exist as perceived by only one side of a conflict, without the requirement that the feeling be reciprocal.) Alternatively, and especially when used in the verb form (rivaled and rivaling in American English, and rivalled and rivalling in British English) it may indicate a relationship of equality, as in "the rival of their peers," "a person without rival," or an "unrivaled performance". The origin of the root rival comes from the Middle French and Latin rivalis, and the French rivus, meaning a person who drinks from or utilizes the same brook or stream as another. The word likely entered the English language around 1577, and appeared in the writings of William Shakespeare as early as 1623, in Two Gentlemen of Verona. (Note: Although superficially similar to the word river, the two do not share an origin, with river instead being derived from the Latin ripa for "bank" or "shore".)

In his 1902 Dictionary of Philosophy and Psychology, James Mark Baldwin defined three main types of rivalry:

1. biological rivalry,
2. personal or conscious rivalry,
3. commercial and industrial rivalry

Alternatively, Kilduff and colleagues in their 2010 review, instead divided among three types of competition (individual, group, and organization), and distinguished rivalry specifically as a "subjective competitive relationship" which necessarily entails "increased psychological involvement and perceived stakes". More modern research has also identified similarity, proximity, and history of competition as necessary antecedents for the establishment of a rivalry, while others have suggested that incivility may reduce the need for a history of competition to solidify the rival relationship.

=== Archrival ===
Where a person or entity has multiple rivals, the most significant one may be called an archrival. In fiction, it is common for a recurring heroic character to have an archrival or archenemy to serve as a foil to the hero, but an archrival may also be distinguished from a nemesis, with the latter being an enemy whom the hero cannot defeat (or who defeats the hero), even while not being a longstanding or consistent enemy to the hero.

== Friendly rivalries ==
A rivalry in which competitors remain at odds over specific issues or outcomes, but otherwise maintain civil relations, can be called a friendly rivalry. Institutions such as universities often maintain friendly rivalries, with the idea that "[a] friendly rivalry encourages an institution to bring to the fore the very best it has to offer, knowing that if it is deficient, others will supersede it". In some instances, institutions such as corporations, sports leagues, or military units, may encourage friendly rivalries between subsets within that institution. For example, in the 1870s, the British Army held a sports competition in which individual military units selected members to compete against those selected by other units, for the purpose of engendering friendly rivalries between the units to promote internal cohesion. Such rivalries may also be encouraged in order to prompt individual members of those subsets to compete more productively.

Interservice rivalries can occur between different branches of a country's armed forces, arising from the competition for limited resources among a nation's land, naval, and air forces. The term also applies to the rivalries between a country's intelligence services (e.g. CIA and FBI in the United States), or between the police and fire services of a city, such as the NYPD and FDNY.

== Rivalry in specific fields ==
=== Interpersonal relationships ===
A variety of rivalries occur in interpersonal relationships.

Sibling rivalry is a type of competition or animosity among siblings, whether blood related or not. Siblings generally spend more time together during childhood than they do with parents. The sibling bond is often complicated and is influenced by factors such as parental treatment, birth order, personality, and people and experiences outside the family. Sibling rivalry is particularly intense when children are very close in age and/or of the same gender and/or where one or both children are intellectually gifted. According to a review by Macionis, older siblings tend to report rivalry peaking in childhood, while younger siblings report a peak later during early adolescence.

Rivalries also occur between people who have competing romantic interests in the same potential romantic partner:

The jealousy mechanism is activated if a committed romantic relationship is threatened by a rival. ... In heterosexual relationships, the rival is an individual of the opposite sex; in homosexual relationships, the rival is of the same sex. The rival can be imagined, suspected, or real. The minimal requirement for an individual to be perceived as a rival is fulfilled if the partner is assumed to be attracted to this other person and if this attraction is considered sufficient to eventually result in the partner's infidelity. It is less clear whether someone should be considered a rival who is attracted to the partner when the partner does not return this attraction, as in this case a partner's infidelity appears rather unlikely.

People employ a number of mechanisms to counter romantic rivals, such as discrediting the characteristics of the rival that the romantic partner might seek in a long-term relationship.

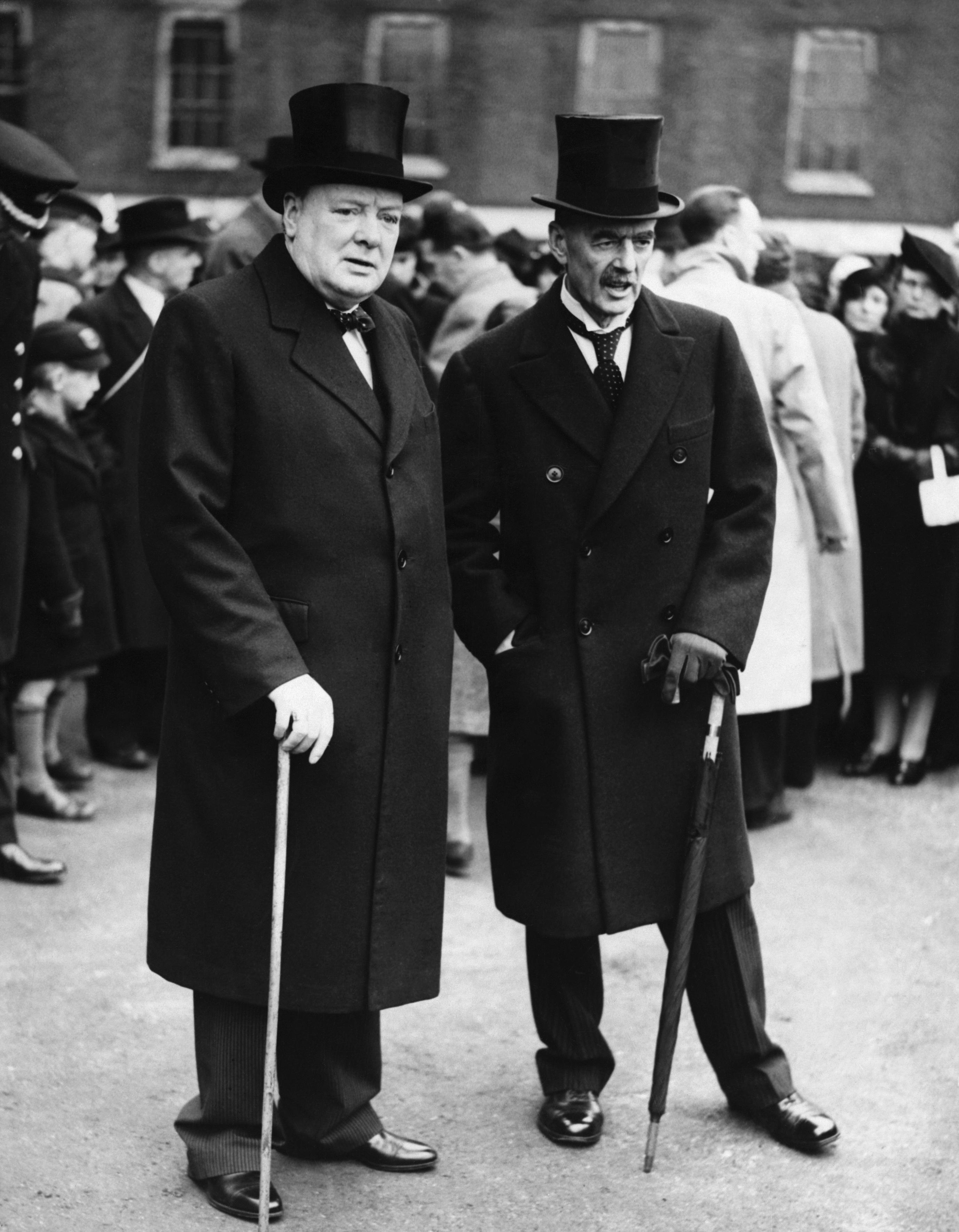
Winston Churchill and Neville Chamberlain were political rivals for the leadership of the UK for much of the 1930s as the Second World War loomed.

=== Economics and politics ===
In economics, both goods and producers of goods are said to be rivals. A good is said to be rivalrous if its consumption by one consumer prevents simultaneous consumption by other consumers. Companies that compete to sell the same goods can become rivals as each seeks to convince consumers to purchase its products, to the exclusion of the products of its rival:

The competition of commercial rivals... centers on mutual exclusion from important markets, or the threat thereof. If a commercial rival continues to gain, there is some likelihood that its closest competitor will be excluded altogether from the market in question, or else reduced to a marginal position there. It is not inconceivable that some commercial rivalries transform into strategic rivalries.

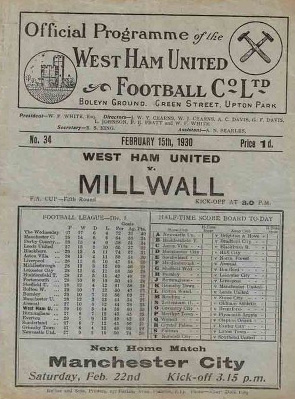
The rivalry between Millwall F.C. and West Ham United F.C. is one of the oldest and bitterest in the history of English football.

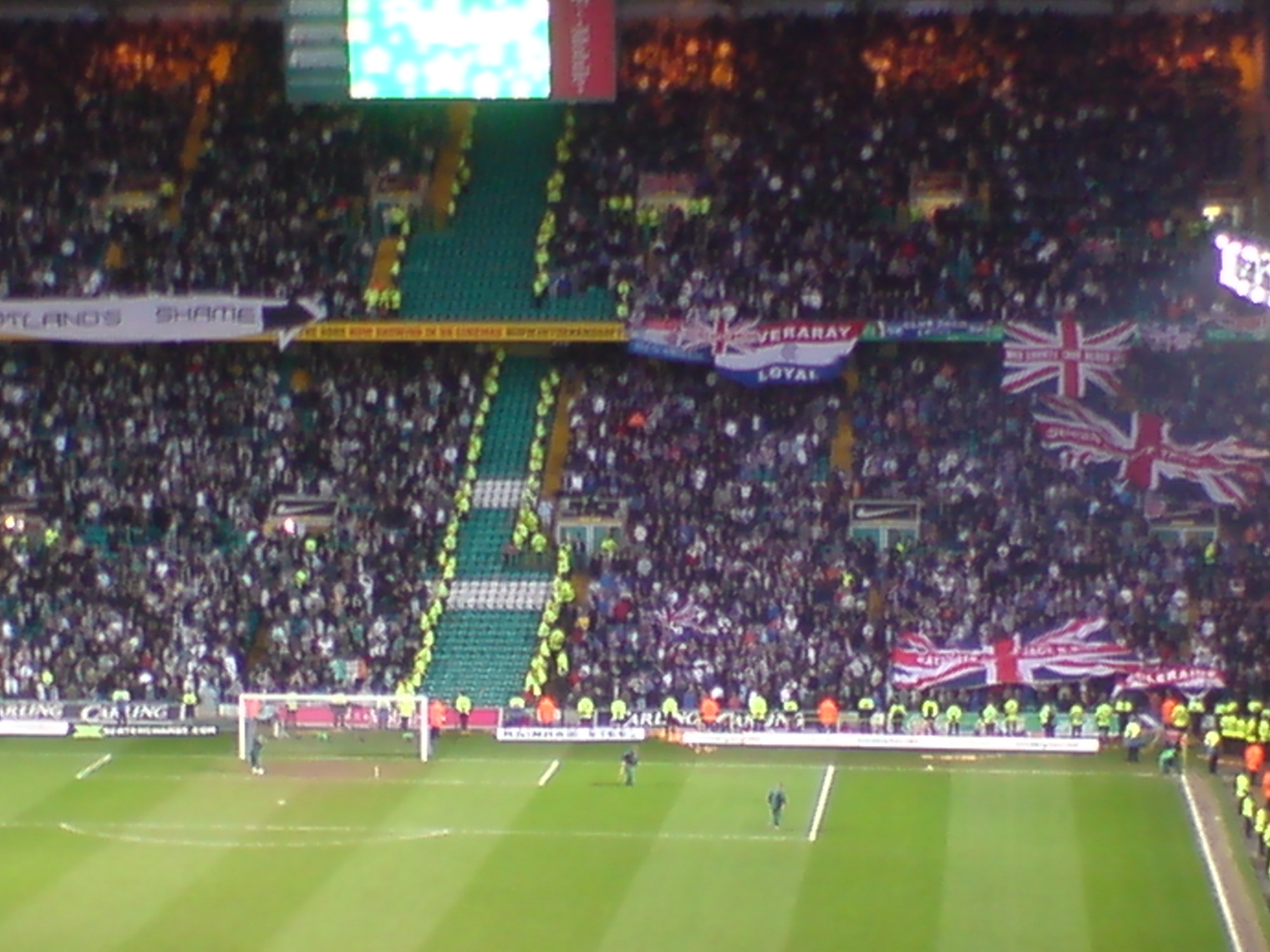
The rivalry between Celtic F.C. and Rangers F.C., both Glasgow teams, is based on the ethno-political sectarianism of The Troubles.

In the study of international relations, rivalries between nation states may be highly formalized or comparatively informal. Shohov and colleagues cite Soviet Union-United States relations during the Cold War as one example of a formalized rivalry, "with its period summits and arms-control negotiations". In either case, the formulation of the rivalry carries with it its own expectation of appropriate behaviors among the participants, which works to sustain the relationship, and limit the avenues available to those who would work to undo it. Rivalries between nations can induce them to compete "over naval armaments, foreign aid, cultural influence, and athletic events", the rivalry in each case occurring within the context of the competitors having "labeled one or more of their adversaries as worthy of particular concern and attention". It has been noted that "while all great powers, almost by definition, are competitors, only some brand each other as rivals", with rivals being "competitors who have been singled out for special attention in some way":

Presumably, there is something unusual about their competitiveness. In most cases, the special significance can be attributed to a perception of acute threat to important values and interests.

== International rivalry ==
Art depicting fictional meeting between Mary, Queen of Scots and rival Elizabeth I

When two or more nations compete against one another, they may engage in a war that lasts for several years or even decades. Multiple factors can lead to rivalries, such as territorial disputes, historical grudges that have shaped the relationship between the two countries, rival ideologies, or economic competition. Depending on the topic of the conflict, there may be military action, illicit activity, or even deception efforts. Rivalries can have detrimental social, political, and economic effects for the nations that are involved. Particularly, a trade conflict may have a negative effect on the economies of the state. The international system may become unstable as a result, for example, if additional states join the fight. Rivalries can sometimes be settled through negotiation under many guises, helping to better mold the international framework and international relationships while preventing the need of the military for conflict.

In, international relations, interstate rivalry is a competitive relationship in which states are involved in conflicts such as militarized or diplomatic disputes due to unresolved issues, creating different types such as historical, territorial, trade, and technological, strategic, or security. Historical conflicts and relationship will shape the behavior or the states decisions for the future, which can make leaders perceive actions as threats, or even create alliances that are also in agreement against the opposing state. Rivalry mainly occurs with states that are persistent and the feud relationship has to occur for a decade to be considered a rivalry, or to go to war, and have several conflicts throughout the years. Territorial disputes, being the most obvious type of rivalry, is when neighboring states creates militarized disputes and conflicts to control another state's border or land. Historical rivalry, is many significant events that cause the two or more states to oppose or see the other as an enemy, over time as many conflicts, and disputes arise it will cause a rivalry make the two states always loathe the state.

There is trade rivalry that occurs when the two state's tensions are rising, so to take action the leaders will increase the price of costs to make the other state suffer as punishment. There are different stages within a rivalry, the act the commence the negative or opposing relationship between the states, over time with different conflicts and disputes escalating the relationship, the states enact in a military dispute, and it de-escalating it and the tensions calms down. Shocks or regime transitions also terminates a rivalry between states, but it highly relies on the leaders creating alliances, agreements or treaties, and bargaining. Rivalry in the world today is created based on history of international relationships and countries perceive it as a strategic process.

=== Sports ===
Sports rivalries are often closely connected with the ritualism associated with sports. Ritualism is "a series of ... iterated acts or performances that are ... famous in terms 'not entirely encoded by the performer'; that is, they are imbued by meanings external to the performer". Everyone who is part of a sports event in some capacity becomes a part of the ritualism associated with sports. Teams get together before the game to warm-up, coaches shake hands with each other, captains have a determiner of who gets the ball first, everyone stands during the national anthem, the fans sit in specific areas, make certain gestures with their hands throughout the game, wearing specific gear that is associated with the team, and have the same post-game practices, every game of every season of every year. It is through this consistency of playing the same teams yearly that "these rivalries have shown remarkable staying power". Specifically, it is society's drive to disrupt these original rituals that start rivalries. Horst Helle says, "society needs a particular quantitative relationship of harmony and disharmony, association and competition, favour and disfavour, in order to take shape in a specific way". Society is drawn to this in sports because this is a principal characteristic in everyday life, which can be seen in historic religious rivalries, such as the contemporary example of sectarianism in Glasgow. Within an area, differences between two types of people can drive the start of a rivalry. Competition and support keep the rivalry going.

In sports, competition tests who has better skill and ability at the time of the game through play. Many rivalries persist because the competition is between two teams that have similar abilities. Spectators gravitate towards competitive rivalries because they are interesting to watch and unpredictable. Society follows competitions because competitions influence "the unity of society". Being loyal to one team in a rivalry brings a sense of belonging to a community of supporters that are hoping that the team they are rooting for wins. The fans of the two different teams do not sit next to each other because this disrupts the community. In a similar way, competition displays an indirect way of fighting. Society does not condone direct fighting as a way of getting something so this is the most passive-aggressive way of fighting. Because this is an acceptable practice, there are many supporters of competition as they fuel a way for the people to participate in a rivalry without the consequences of fighting. However, when the competition is not enough in sports and the tensions are high fighting may ensue.

A Glenn Guilbeau, a sportswriter codified the essentials of a sports rivalry in the United States. To be termed a rivalry, the competition requires

1. True hatred on both sides; not just an inferiority complex from one group of supporters.
2. Proximity – the closer, the better.
3. Each team needs to have a winning season. Otherwise the team with the most wins can't take the other team seriously.
4. A "history." Short term rivalries seem irrelevant.
5. Not essential, but important for the "hate" factor is national significance (for college teams). Otherwise, no one else may care.

== Effects ==
Rivalries may increase motivation, lead to greater effort, and better performance. They may also contribute to greater risk taking behavior among participants, and increase a propensity for unethical behavior.

These differences may lead to poor decision making on the part of groups and individuals that may not otherwise take place in the absence of a rivalry. Examples examined in the literature include the 1994 attacks by figure skater Tonya Harding against her rival Nancy Kerrigan, the admission in court by British Airways that they had engaged in a number of unethical practices against their business rival Virgin Atlantic (including stealing confidential data and spreading rumors about CEO Richard Branson), and the overpayment of Boston Scientific in their acquisition (called the "second worst" ever) of Guidant, due to the fact that they were bidding against their rival company Johnson & Johnson. At the extreme, competition between rivals "possesses some likelihood of escalation to physical damage".

== See also ==
- Dassler brothers feud
- Blonde versus brunette rivalry
- College rivalry
- Enemy
- Group dynamics, behaviors and psychological processes occurring within or between social groups
- List of sports rivalries
- Monocular rivalry and Binocular rivalry in visual perception
- Rivals.com, a network of United States–based sports Web sites with a particular emphasis on college sports and a subordinate emphasis on recruiting
