= Bridge locus =

Neuroscience concept

In neuroscience the bridge locus for a particular sensory percept is a hypothetical set of neurons whose activity is the basis of that sensory percept. The term was introduced by D.N. Teller and E.Y. Pugh Jr. in 1983, and has been sparingly used. Activity in the bridge locus neurons is postulated to be necessary and sufficient for sensory perception: if the bridge locus neurons are not active, then the sensory perception does not occur, regardless of the actual sensory input. Conversely if the bridge locus neurons are active, then sensory perception occurs, regardless of the actual sensory input. It is the highest neural level of a sensory perception. So, for example, retinal neurons are not considered a bridge locus for visual perception because stimulating visual cortex can give rise to visual percepts.

Not all scholars believe in such a neural correlate of consciousness. Pessoa et al., for example, argue that there is no necessity for a bridge locus, basing their argument on the requirement of an isomorphism between neural states and conscious states. Thompson argues that there are good reasons to think that the notion of a bridge locus, which he calls a "localizationist approach", is misguided, questioning the premise that there has to be one particular neural stage whose activity forms the immediate substrate of perception. He argues, based upon work by Zeki & Shipp, DeYoe & Van Essen, and others, that brain regions are not independent stages or modules but have dense forward and backward projections that act reciprocally, and that visual processing is highly interactive and context-dependent. He also argues that cells in the visual cortex "are not mere 'feature detectors'", and that neuroscience has revealed that the brain in fact employs distributed networks, rather than centralized representations. He equates the notion of a bridge locus to a Cartesian theatre and suggests that as a notion it should be abandoned.
