= Monocular rivalry =

Optical illusion

Demonstration of monocular rivalry between two component sine-wave gratings: a vertical green-and-black grating and a horizontal red-and-black grating.

Monocular rivalry is a phenomenon of human visual perception that occurs when two different images are optically superimposed. During prolonged viewing, one image becomes clearer than the other for a few moments, then the other image becomes clearer than the first for a few moments. These alternations in clarity continue at random for as long as one looks. Occasionally one image will become exclusively visible and the other image invisible.

In the demonstration, one image is a green grating and the other is a red grating. During prolonged inspection, the viewer can see the green grating as clearer than the red grating for a few moments, then the reverse. Occasionally the green grating will be all that is visible and occasionally the red grating will be all that is visible. Occasionally, at transitions, one will briefly see irregular composites of the two gratings (such as the red and green gratings superimposed but with one or two bars of the green grating invisible).

Monocular rivalry is easier to see when the component stimuli are of opposite colors, but it also occurs when the component stimuli have the same colors. As long as the two component stimuli differ spatiotemporally in some way, such as orientation (as shown), spatial frequency, or direction of movement, monocular rivalry can be seen.

== History of monocular rivalry ==
Monocular rivalry was discovered by Marius Tscherning in 1898. It was independently discovered, and named, by Breese (1899). He called it monocular rivalry to distinguish it from binocular rivalry, a similar phenomenon in which the different images are presented to opposite eyes. Monocular rivalry was rediscovered by Campbell and Howell (1972). They called the phenomenon monocular pattern alternation, but Campbell called it monocular rivalry in later papers, and that is the term that has stuck, even though the phenomenon does not require monocular viewing. Maier, Logothetis, and Leopold (2005)advocated calling the phenomenon pattern rivalry.

After a burst of research activity in the 1970s, monocular rivalry fell out of favour when Georgeson and Phillips (1980) argued that monocular rivalry arises from afterimages and eye movements. They argued that with gratings, prolonged fixation of the stimuli builds up a negative afterimage that will tend to cancel the real images, making both invisible (a form of neural adaptation). An eye movement at right angles to one grating of one half of the period of the grating will make the afterimage reinforce that original image, making it spring into visibility while the other grating remains invisible. A correct eye movement at right angles to the second grating will make it visible and leave the first invisible. Random eye movements, therefore, could be responsible for the random fluctuations in clarity and visibility of the two images.

Although afterimages and eye movements must contribute to monocular rivalry, they cannot be a complete explanation for at least four reasons: First, it occurs with stimuli other than gratings for which afterimages would not cancel or reinforce the original images (e.g., Sindermann & Lüddeke, 1972). Second, it occurs when the stimuli themselves are afterimages; these cannot be cancelled or reinforced by eye movements (Crassini & Broerse, 1982). Third, sometimes a perceptual alternation occurs after an eye movement in the wrong direction for Georgeson and Phillips's explanation (Bradley & Schor, 1988). Fourth, visibility of an irregular composite of the two images cannot be explained by eye movements. To be explained by cancellation of afterimages, such composites impossibly require that different parts of the retina move in different directions.

In 1997, Andrews and Purves revived interest in monocular rivalry by showing that its alternations could be entrained by binocular rivalry alternations in an adjacent part of the visual field.

== Explanations of monocular rivalry ==
Tscherning (1898) pointed out the similarity of monocular rivalry to binocular rivalry. Breese (1899) attributed monocular rivalry to the same mechanism as responsible for binocular rivalry. Leopold and Logothetis (1999) argued that it, and binocular rivalry, are examples of multistable perception phenomena, including the Necker cube and Rubin vase figure.

== See also ==
- Motion-induced interocular suppression
- Multistable perception
- Perception
