= Motion-induced interocular suppression =

Optical phenomenon

Motion-induced interocular suppression is a phenomenon in which when one eye is presented with a constantly moving visual pattern while the other eye is shown a stationary image, the stationary image is suppressed from awareness for long periods of time. The duration of this motion-induced interocular suppression is comparable to that of continuous flash suppression; thus, the two methods can be used alternatively.

The duration of suppression in both methods is maximized if the image being suppressed has low luminance contrast or a low spatial frequency spectrum. Motion-induced interocular suppression is fundamentally different from motion induced blindness: firstly, the latter is due to the interaction of moving and stationary stimuli closely located within the same eye, while the former requires an interaction between stimuli presented to different eyes in corresponding visual areas. Secondly, motion-induced interocular suppression can induce invisibility of a large stimulus presented at the fovea, whereas motion-induced blindness requires the stimulus to be small and peripherally located. Thirdly, decreasing the contrast of the stimulus to be suppressed increases the duration of motion-induced interocular suppression, but decreases the duration of motion-induced blindness. Whether motion-induced interocular suppression and continuous flash suppression have common neural mechanisms is still unknown.
