= Flash suppression =

Phenomenon of visual perception

Flash suppression is a phenomenon of visual perception in which an image presented to one eye is suppressed by a flash of another image presented to the other eye.

To observe flash suppression, a small image is first presented to one eye for about a second while a blank field is presented to the other eye. Then a different, small image is abruptly shown, flashed, to the other, second eye at the location corresponding to the image to the first eye. The image to the first eye disappears, even though it is still presented, and only the new image is perceived. The new image to the second eye suppresses perception of the image to the first. For example, if a vehicle is shown to the left eye for one second, and then a face is abruptly flashed to the right eye, the observer consciously sees first a vehicle and then a face. Note that the face is seen while the picture of the car is still present. If the order of presentation is reversed, the order of percept is reversed. The phenomenon of flash suppression seems to have been known since the 19th century. The phenomena was described by McDougall in 1901 and utilized for an EEG experiment by Lansing in 1964. In 1984, Jeremy Wolfe characterized flash suppression in a systematic psychophysics study.

Flash suppression is an example of illusions that render a highly visible image invisible and that are used to study the mechanisms of conscious and non-conscious visual processing. Related perceptual illusions include backward masking, binocular rivalry, motion induced blindness and motion-induced interocular suppression.

The brain basis of flash suppression has been studied using microelectrode recordings in the visual brain of the macaque monkey and in the human medial temporal lobe.

== Relationship with binocular rivalry ==
Flash suppression occurs due to the conflict between the inputs to the two eyes. When this conflict is sustained without any abrupt events, binocular rivalry occurs. In both flash suppression and binocular rivalry, perceptual conflict between the two eyes is required for the perceptual effect. If two similar images are used, fusion of the two images is experienced, rather than flash suppression or binocular rivalry. Despite some similarities in perceptual consequences, the neuronal mechanisms responsible for the two illusions can be different. For example, the strength (depth) of flash suppression seems much stronger than that of binocular rivalry. Comparative studies of the two methods are needed.

Flash suppression has certain methodological advantages over binocular rivalry as a tool for probing conscious vision. Whereas the percept during binocular rivalry alternates stochastically, the percept during flash suppression is precisely controlled in time.

Although flash suppression allows one to present an image to someone without his or her seeing it consciously, it requires a to-be-erased image to be presented for a fraction of second before introduction of a new image. This requirement limits the usage of flash suppression for the study of nonconscious visual processing.

== Continuous flash suppression ==
A powerful variant of flash suppression is continuous flash suppression, originally reported by Nao Tsuchiya and Christof Koch (2004) and Fang and He (2005). Here a small, fixed image in the first eye—say a gray-scale fearful face—is completely suppressed by a stream of constantly changing images flashed into the second eye (say a series of colorful Mondrian-scenes replaced every 0.1 sec by a new Mondrian pattern). This suppression can last for minutes, a remarkable testament to the fact that humans often do not see what is directly in front of their eyes.

Continuous flash suppression is a useful method for psychologists and neuroscientists interested in studying the mechanisms of conscious and nonconscious visual processing. Whereas other visual illusions that render otherwise salient images invisible have their own shortcomings and advantages, continuous flash suppression has a number of advantages for wiping images from conscious vision. It can erase an image presented at the fovea (which usually is much more resistant to perceptual suppression, unlike, for example, crowding), in every trial (unlike binocular rivalry), for a longer duration (>1 sec, unlike backward masking), with an excellent control of timing (unlike binocular rivalry). It has been widely exploited to tackle the scope and limits of unconscious processing.

== Generalized flash suppression ==
The differences between flash suppression and binocular rivalry have been further emphasized by the finding that stimulus conflict between the two eyes is not a requirement to achieve visual suppression. The novel paradigm of generalized flash suppression (GFS) reported by Wilke, Logothetis and Leopold in 2003 demonstrates that any visual stimulus can be rendered invisible when presented outside the fovea for a certain amount of time, followed by the addition of a distracting second stimulus in its vicinity.

This effect is strongest when the two stimuli are presented to (different regions in) opposite eyes, which suggests that it is somewhat related to binocular rivalry. At the same time, GFS shares similarities to Troxler's fading and motion induced blindness.

A recent study on the neuronal basis of GFS demonstrated that neuronal activity in early visual cortex was untouched by the perceptual effect, whereas neurons in higher areas altered their activity pattern during the illusion. Authors report that the disappearance of the stimulus triggered changes in the local field potentials of all these areas, suggesting that the perception during flash suppression is reflected in large parts of the brain.
