= Binocular rivalry =

Optical phenomenon

Binocular rivalry is a phenomenon of visual perception in which perception alternates between different images presented to each eye.

An image demonstrating binocular rivalry. If one views the image with red-cyan 3D glasses, the text will alternate between red and blue. 3D red cyan glasses are recommended to view this image correctly.

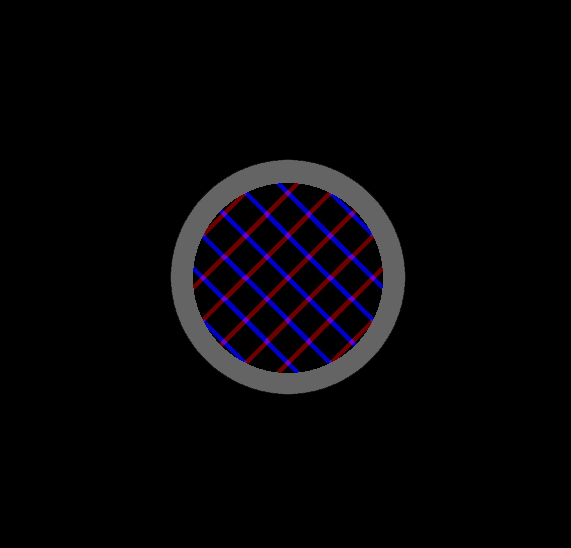
Binocular rivalry. If one views the image with red-cyan 3D glasses, the angled Warp and weft will alternate between the red and the blue lines. 3D red cyan glasses are recommended to view this image correctly.

When one image is presented to one eye and a very different image is presented to the other (also known as dichoptic presentation), instead of the two images being seen superimposed, one image is seen for a few moments, then the other, then the first, and so on, randomly for as long as one cares to look. For example, if a set of vertical lines is presented to one eye, and a set of horizontal lines to the same region of the retina of the other, sometimes the vertical lines are seen with no trace of the horizontal lines, and sometimes the horizontal lines are seen with no trace of the vertical lines.

At transitions, brief, unstable composites of the two images may be seen. For example, the vertical lines may appear one at a time to obscure the horizontal lines from the left or from the right, like a traveling wave, switching slowly one image for the other. Binocular rivalry occurs between any stimuli that differ sufficiently, including simple stimuli like lines of different orientation and complex stimuli like different alphabetic letters or different pictures such as of a face and of a house.

Very small differences between images, however, might yield singleness of vision and stereopsis. Binocular rivalry has been extensively studied in the last century. In recent years neuroscientists have used neuroimaging techniques and single-cell recording techniques to identify neural events responsible for the perceptual dominance of a given image and for the perceptual alternations.

== Types ==
When the images presented to the eyes differ only in their contours, rivalry is referred to as binocular contour rivalry. When the images presented to the eyes differ only in their colours, rivalry is referred to as binocular colour rivalry. When the images presented to the eyes differ only in their lightnesses, a form of rivalry called binocular lustre may be seen. When an image is presented to one eye and a blank field to the other, the image is usually seen continuously. This is referred to as contour dominance. Occasionally however, the blank field, or even the dark field of a closed eye, can become visible, making the image invisible for about as long as it would be invisible were it in rivalry with another image of equal stimulus strength. When an image is presented to one eye and a blank field to the other, introducing a different image onto the blank field usually results in that image being seen immediately. This is referred to as flash suppression.

== History ==
Binocular rivalry was discovered by Porta in 1593. Porta put one book in front of one eye, and another in front of the other. He reported that he could read from one book at a time and that changing from one to the other required withdrawing the "visual virtue" from one eye and moving it to the other. According to Wade (1998), binocular colour rivalry was first reported by Le Clerc (1712). Desaguiliers (1716) also recorded it when looking at different colours from spectra in the bevel of a mirror. The clearest early description of both colour and contour rivalry was made by Dutour (1760, 1763). To experience colour rivalry Dutour either crossed his eyes or overdiverged his eyes (a form of free fusion commonly used also at the end of the 20th century to view Magic Eye stereograms) to look at differently coloured pieces of cloth (Dutour 1760) or differently coloured pieces of glass (Dutour 1763). To experience contour rivalry Dutour again used free fusion of different objects or used a prism or a mirror in front of one eye to project different images into it. The first clear description of rivalry in English was by Charles Wheatstone (1838). Wheatstone invented the stereoscope, an optical device (in Wheatstone's case using mirrors) to present different images to the two eyes.

== Early theories ==
Various theories were proposed to account for binocular rivalry. Porta and Dutour took it as evidence for an ancient theory of visual perception that has come to be known as suppression theory. Its essential idea is that, despite having two eyes, we see only one of everything (known as singleness of vision) because we see with one eye at a time. According to this theory, we do not normally notice the alternations between the two eyes because their images are too similar. By making the images very different, Porta and Dutour argued, this natural alternation can be seen. Wheatstone, on the other hand, supported the alternative theory of singleness of vision, fusion theory, proposed by Aristotle. Its essential idea is that we see only one of everything because the information from the two eyes is combined or fused. Wheatstone also discovered binocular stereopsis, the perception of depth arising from the lateral placement of the eyes. Wheatstone was able to prove that stereopsis depended on the different horizontal positions (the horizontal disparity) of points in the images viewed by each eye by creating the illusion of depth from flat depictions of such images displayed in his stereoscope. Such stereopsis is impossible unless information is being combined from each eye. Although Wheatstone's discovery of stereopsis supported fusion theory, he still had to account for binocular rivalry. He regarded binocular rivalry as a special case in which fusion is impossible, saying "the mind is inattentive to impressions made on one retina when it cannot combine the impressions on the two retinae together so as to occasion a perception resembling that of some external object" (p. 264).

Other theories of binocular rivalry dealt more with how it occurs than why it occurs. Dutour speculated that the alternations could be controlled by attention, a theory promoted in the nineteenth century by Hermann von Helmholtz. But Dutour also speculated that the alternations could be controlled by structural properties of the images (such as by temporary fluctuations in the blur of one image, or temporary fluctuations in the luminance of one image). This theory was promoted in the nineteenth century by Helmholtz's traditional rival, Ewald Hering.

== Empirical studies: B. B. Breese (1899, 1909) ==
The most comprehensive early study of binocular rivalry was conducted by B. B. Breese (1899, 1909). Breese quantified the amount of rivalry by requiring his observers to press keys while observing rivalry for 100-second trials. An observer pressed one key whenever and for as long as he or she saw one rival stimulus with no trace of the other, and another key whenever and for as long as he or she saw the other rival stimulus with no trace of the first. This has come to be known as recording periods of exclusive visibility. From the key-press records (Breese's were made on a kymograph drum), Breese was able to quantify rivalry in three ways: the number of periods of exclusive visibility of each stimulus (the rate of rivalry), the total duration of exclusive visibility of each stimulus, and the average duration of each period of rivalry.

Breese first found that although observers could increase the time one rival stimulus was seen by attending to it, they could not increase the rate of that stimulus. Moreover, when he asked his observers to refrain from moving their eyes over the attended stimulus, control was abolished. When he asked observers specifically to move their eyes over one stimulus, that stimulus predominated in rivalry. He could also increase predominance of a stimulus by increasing the number of its contours, by moving it, by reducing its size, by making it brighter, and by contracting the muscles on the same side of the body as the eye viewing that stimulus. Breese also showed that rivalry occurs between afterimages. Breese also discovered the phenomenon of monocular rivalry: if the two rival stimuli are optically superimposed to the same eye and one fixates on the stimuli, then alternations in the clarity of the two stimuli are seen. Occasionally, one image disappears altogether, as in binocular rivalry, although this is much rarer than in binocular rivalry.

== Other senses ==
Auditory and olfactory forms of perceptual rivalry can occur when there are conflicting and so rivaling inputs into the two ears or two nostrils.

== See also ==
- Binocular summation
- Binocular vision
- Diplopia
