= Tonotopy =

Arrangement of sound frequency processing in the brain

In physiology, tonotopy (from Greek tono = frequency and topos = place) is the spatial arrangement of where sounds of different frequency are processed in the brain. Tones close to each other in terms of frequency are represented in topologically neighbouring regions in the brain. Tonotopic maps are a particular case of topographic organization, similar to retinotopy in the visual system.

Tonotopy in the auditory system begins at the cochlea, the small coiled structure in the inner ear that sends information about sound to the brain. Different regions of the basilar membrane in the organ of Corti, the sound-sensitive portion of the cochlea, vibrate at different sinusoidal frequencies due to variations in thickness and width along the length of the membrane. Nerves that transmit information from different regions of the basilar membrane therefore encode frequency tonotopically.

This tonotopy then projects through the vestibulocochlear nerve and associated midbrain structures to the primary auditory cortex via the auditory radiation pathway. Throughout this radiation, organization is linear with relation to placement on the organ of Corti, in accordance to the best frequency response (that is, the frequency at which that neuron is most sensitive) of each neuron. However, binaural fusion in the superior olivary complex onward adds significant amounts of information encoded in the signal strength of each ganglion. Thus, the number of tonotopic maps varies between species and the degree of binaural synthesis and separation of sound intensities; in humans, six tonotopic maps have been identified in the primary auditory cortex.

== History ==
The earliest evidence for tonotopic organization in auditory cortex was indicated by Vladimir E. Larionov in an 1899 paper entitled "On the musical centers of the brain", which suggested that lesions in an S-shaped trajectory resulted in failure to respond to tones of different frequencies. By the 1920s, cochlear anatomy had been described and the concept of tonotopicity had been introduced. At this time, Hungarian biophysicist, Georg von Békésy began further exploration of tonotopy in the auditory cortex. Békésy measured the cochlear traveling wave by opening up the cochlea widely and using a strobe light and microscope to visually observe the motion on a wide variety of animals including guinea pig, chicken, mouse, rat, cow, elephant, and human temporal bone. Importantly, Békésy found that different sound frequencies caused maximum wave amplitudes to occur at different places along the basilar membrane along the coil of the cochlea, which is the fundamental principle of tonotopy. Békésy was awarded the Nobel Prize in Physiology for Medicine for his work.

In 1946, the first live demonstration of tonotopic organization in auditory cortex occurred at Johns Hopkins Hospital. More recently, advances in technology have allowed researchers to map the tonotopic organization in healthy human subjects using electroencephalographic (EEG) and magnetoencephalographic (MEG) data. While most human studies agree on the existence of a tonotopic gradient map in which low frequencies are represented laterally and high frequencies are represented medially around Heschl's gyrus, a more detailed map in human auditory cortex is not yet firmly established due to methodological limitations

== Sensory mechanisms ==
=== Peripheral nervous system ===
==== Cochlea ====
Tonotopic organization in the cochlea forms throughout pre- and post-natal development through a series of changes that occur in response to auditory stimuli. Research suggests that the pre-natal establishment of tonotopic organization is partially guided by synaptic reorganization; however, more recent studies have shown that the early changes and refinements occur at both the circuit and subcellular levels. In mammals, after the inner ear is otherwise fully developed, the tonotopic map is then reorganized in order to accommodate higher and more specific frequencies. Research has suggested that the receptor guanylyl cyclase Npr2 is vital for the precise and specific organization of this tonotopy. Further experiments have demonstrated a conserved role of Sonic Hedgehog emanating from the notochord and floor plate in establishing tonotopic organization during early development. It is this proper tonotopic organization of the hair cells in the cochlea that allows for correct perception of frequency as the proper pitch.

==== Structural organization ====
In the cochlea, sound creates a traveling wave that moves from base to apex, increasing in amplitude as it moves along a tonotopic axis in the basilar membrane (BM). This pressure wave travels along the BM of the cochlea until it reaches an area that corresponds to its maximum vibration frequency; this is then coded as pitch. High frequency sounds stimulate neurons at the base of the structure and lower frequency sounds stimulate neurons at the apex. This represents cochlear tonotopic organization. This occurs because the mechanical properties of the BM are graded along a tonotopic axis; this conveys distinct frequencies to hair cells (mechanosensory cells that amplify cochlear vibrations and send auditory information to the brain), establishing receptor potentials and, consequently frequency tuning. For example, the BM increases in stiffness towards its base.

==== Mechanisms of cochlear tonotopy ====
Hair bundles, or the "mechanical antenna" of hair cells, are thought to be particularly important in cochlear tonotopy. The morphology of hair bundles likely contributes to the BM gradient. Tonotopic position determines the structure of hair bundles in the cochlea. The height of hair bundles increases from base to apex and the number of stereocilia decreases (i.e. hair cells located at the base of the cochlea contain more stereo cilia than those located at the apex).

Furthermore, in the tip-link complex of cochlear hair cells, tonotopy is associated with gradients of intrinsic mechanical properties. In the hair bundle, gating springs determine the open probability of mechanoelectrical ion transduction channels: at higher frequencies, these elastic springs are subject to higher stiffness and higher mechanical tension in tip-links of hair cells. This is emphasized by the division of labor between outer and inner hair cells, in which mechanical gradients for outer hair cells (responsible for amplification of lower frequency sounds) have higher stiffness and tension.

Tonotopy also manifests in the electrophysical properties of transduction. Sound energy is translated into neural signals through mechanoelectrical transduction. The magnitude of peak transduction current varies with tonotopic position. For example, currents are largest at high frequency positions such as the base of cochlea. As noted above, basal cochlear hair cells have more stereocilia, thus providing more channels and larger currents. Tonotopic position also determines the conductance of individual transduction channels. Individual channels at basal hair cells conduct more current than those at apical hair cells.

Finally, sound amplification is greater in the basal than in the apical cochlear regions because outer hair cells express the motor protein prestin, which amplifies vibrations and increases sensitivity of outer hair cells to lower sounds.

=== Central nervous system ===
==== Cortex ====
Audio frequency, otherwise known as the pitch, is currently the only characteristic of sound that is known with certainty to be topographically mapped in the central nervous system. However, other characteristics may form similar maps in the cortex such as sound intensity, tuning bandwidth, or modulation rate, but these have not been as well studied.

In the midbrain, there exist two primary auditory pathways to the auditory cortex—the lemniscal classical auditory pathway and the extralemniscal non-classical auditory pathway. The lemniscal classical auditory pathway is tonotopically organized and consists of the central nucleus of the inferior colliculus and the ventral medial geniculate body projecting to primary areas in the auditory cortex. The non-primary auditory cortex receives inputs from the extralemniscal non-classical auditory pathway, which shows a diffuse frequency organization.

The tonotopic organization of the auditory cortex has been extensively examined and is therefore better understood compared to other areas of the auditory pathway. Tonotopy of the auditory cortex has been observed in many animal species including birds, rodents, primates, and other mammals. In mice, four subregions of the auditory cortex have been found to exhibit tonotopic organization. The classically divided A1 subregion has been found to in fact be two distinct tonopic regions—A1 and the dorsomedial field (DM). Auditory cortex region A2 and the anterior auditory field (AAF) both have tonotopic maps that run dorsoventrally. The other two regions of the mouse auditory cortex, the dorsoanterior field (DA) and the dorsoposterior field (DP) are non-tonotopic. While neurons in these non-tonotopic regions have a characteristic frequency, they are arranged randomly.

Studies using non-human primates have generated a hierarchical model of auditory cortical organization consisting of an elongated core consisting of three back-to-back tonotopic fields—the primary auditory field A1, the rostral field R, and the rostral temporal field RT. These regions are surrounded by belt fields (secondary) regions and higher-order parabelt fields. A1 exhibits a frequency gradient from high to low in the posterior-to-anterior direction; R exhibits a reverse gradient with characteristic frequencies from low to high in the posterior-to-anterior direction. RT has a less clearly organized gradient from high back to low frequencies. These primary tonotopic patterns continuously extend into the surrounding belt areas.

Tonotopic organization in the human auditory cortex has been studied using a variety of non-invasive imaging techniques including magneto- and electroencephalography (MEG/EEG), positron emission tomography (PET), and functional magnetic resonance imaging (fMRI). The primary tonotopic map in the human auditory cortex is along Heschl's gyrus(HG). However, various researchers have reached conflicting conclusions about the direction of frequency gradient along HG. Some experiments found that tonotopic progression ran parallel along HG while others found that the frequency gradient ran perpendicularly across HG in a diagonal direction, forming an angled V-shaped pair of gradients.

==== In mice ====
One of the well-established methods of studying tonotopic patterning in the auditory cortex during development is tone-rearing. In mouse Primary Auditory Cortex (A1), different neurons respond to different ranges of frequencies with one particular frequency eliciting the largest response – this is known as the "best frequency" for a given neuron. Exposing mouse pups to one particular frequency during the auditory critical period (postnatal day 12 to 15) will shift the "best frequencies" of neurons in A1 towards the exposed frequency tone.

These frequency shifts in response to environmental stimuli have been shown to improve performance in perceptual behavior tasks in adult mice that were tone-reared during auditory critical period. Adult learning and critical period sensory manipulations induce comparable shifts in cortical topographies, and by definition adult learning results in increased perceptual abilities. The tonotopic development of A1 in mouse pups is therefore an important factor in understanding the neurological basis of auditory learning.

Other species also show similar tonotopic development during critical periods. Rat tonotopic develop is nearly identical to mouse, but the critical period is shifted slightly earlier, and barn owls show an analogous auditory development in Interaural Time Differences (ITD).

==== Plasticity of auditory critical period ====
The auditory critical period of rats, which lasts from postnatal day 11 (P11) to P13 can be extended through deprivation experiments such as white noise-rearing. It has been shown that subsets of the tonotopic map in A1 can be held in a plastic state indefinitely by exposing the rats to white noise consisting of frequencies within a particular range determined by the experimenter. For example, exposing a rat during auditory critical period to white noise that includes tone frequencies between 7 kHz and 10 kHz will keep the corresponding neurons in a plastic state far past the typical critical period–one study has retained this plastic state until the rats were 90 days old. Recent studies have also found that release of the neurotransmitter norepinephrine is required for critical period plasticity in the auditory cortex, however intrinsic tonotopic patterning of the auditory cortical circuitry occurs independently from norepinephrine release. A recent toxicity study showed that in-utero and postnatal exposure to polychlorinated biphenyl (PCB) altered overall primary auditory cortex (A1) organization, including tonotopy and A1 topography. Early PCB exposure also changed the balance of excitatory and inhibitory inputs, which altered the ability of the auditory cortex to plastically reorganize after changes in the acoustic environment, thereby altering the critical period of auditory plasticity.

==== Adult plasticity ====
Studies in mature A1 have focused on neuromodulatory influences and have found that direct and indirect vagus nerve stimulation, which triggers neuromodulator release, promotes adult auditory plasticity. Cholinergic signaling has been shown to engage 5-HT3AR cell activity across cortical areas and facilitate adult auditory plasticity. Furthermore, behavioral training using rewarding or aversive stimuli, commonly known to engage cholinergic afferents and 5-HT3AR cells, has also been shown to alter and shift adult tonotopic maps.

== See also ==
- Place theory (hearing)
- Topographic maps
