= Bushy cell =

Bushy cells are two types of second order neuron found in the anterior part of the ventral cochlear nucleus, the AVCN. They can be globular or spherical giving outputs to different parts of the superior olivary complex.

== Structure ==
Bushy cells are named after their appearance to bushes, having short dendrites. They are almost completely engulfed by the synaptic connections from the endbulbs of Held.

== Function ==
Because of the large synaptic contact from the auditory nerve fibres, the output pattern from the bushy cell is almost the same as the auditory nerve input. Projections from the globular bushy cells extend to the superior olive on both sides of the brainstem where they give input to the bipolar neurons. The superior olive is an area seen to be of importance in the processing of binaural signals.

Projections from the spherical bushy cells give excitatory input to the lateral and medial parts of the superior olive (the LSO and MSO). Again their very close synaptic coupling suggest a part in the role of processing interaural time differences, while their connection to the LSO suggests that fast timing is also important in processing interaural level difference.

== See also ==
List of distinct cell types in the adult human body
