= Startle response =

Action or movement due to the application of a sudden unexpected stimulus

In animals, including humans, the startle response is a largely unconscious defensive response to sudden or threatening stimuli, such as sudden noise or sharp movement, and is associated with negative affect. Usually the onset of the startle response is a startle reflex reaction. The startle reflex is a brainstem reflectory reaction (reflex) that serves to protect vulnerable parts, such as the back of the neck (whole-body startle) and the eyes (eyeblink) and facilitates escape from sudden stimuli. It is found across many different species, throughout all stages of life. A variety of responses may occur depending on the affected individual's emotional state, body posture, preparation for execution of a motor task, or other activities.

== Startle reflex ==
=== Neurophysiology ===
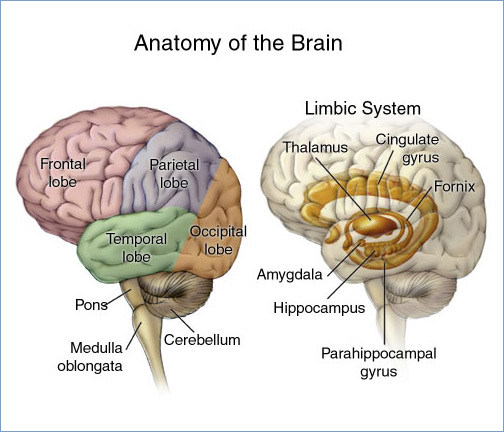
Layout of the brain

A startle reflex can occur in the body through a combination of actions. A reflex from hearing a sudden loud noise will happen in the primary acoustic startle reflex pathway consisting of three main central synapses, or signals that travel through the brain.

First, there is a synapse from the auditory nerve fibers in the ear to the cochlear root neurons (CRN). These are the first acoustic neurons of the central nervous system. Studies have shown a direct correlation to the amount of decrease of the startle to the number of CRNs that were killed. Second, there is a synapse from the CRN axons to the cells in the nucleus reticularis pontis caudalis (PnC) of the brain. These are neurons that are located in the pons of the brainstem. A study done to disrupt this portion of the pathway by the injection of PnC inhibitory chemicals has shown a dramatic decrease in the amount of startle by about 80 to 90 percent. Third, a synapse occurs from the PnC axons to the motor neurons in the facial motor nucleus or the spinal cord that will directly or indirectly control the movement of muscles. The activation of the facial motor nucleus causes a jerk of the head while an activation in the spinal cord causes the whole body to startle.

During neuromotor examinations of newborns, it is noted that, for a number of techniques, the patterns of the startle reaction and the Moro reflex may significantly overlap, the notable distinction being the absence of arm abduction (spreading) during startle responses.

=== Reflexes ===
There are many various reflexes that can occur simultaneously during a startle response. The fastest reflex recorded in humans happens within the masseter muscle or jaw muscle. The reflex was measured by electromyography which records the electrical activity during movement of the muscles. This also showed the response latency, or the delay between the stimulus and the response recorded, was found to be about 14 milliseconds. The blink of the eye which is the reflex of the orbicularis oculi muscle was found to have a latency of about 20 to 40 milliseconds. Out of larger body parts, the head is quickest in a movement latency in a range from 60 to 120 milliseconds. The neck then moves almost simultaneously with a latency of 75 to 121 milliseconds. Next, the shoulder jerks at 100 to 121 milliseconds along with the arms at 125 to 195 milliseconds. Lastly the legs respond with a latency of 145 to 395 milliseconds. This type of cascading response correlates to how the synapses travel from the brain and down the spinal cord to activate each motor neuron.

=== Acoustic startle reflex ===
The acoustic startle reflex is thought to be caused by an auditory stimulus greater than 80 decibels. The reflex is typically measured by electromyography, brain imaging or sometimes positron emission tomography. There are many brain structures and pathways thought to be involved in the reflex. The amygdala, hippocampus, bed nucleus of the stria terminalis (BNST) and anterior cingulate cortex are all thought to play a role in modulating the reflex. The anterior cingulate cortex in the brain is largely thought to be the main area associated with emotional response and awareness, which can contribute to the way an individual reacts to startle-inducing stimuli. Along with the anterior cingulate cortex, the amygdala and the hippocampus are known to have implications in this reflex.

The amygdala is known to have a role in the "fight-or-flight response", and the hippocampus functions to form memories of the stimulus and the emotions associated with it. The role of the BNST in the acoustic startle reflex may be attributed to specific areas within the nucleus responsible for stress and anxiety responses. Activation of the BNST by certain hormones is thought to promote a startle response. The auditory pathway for this response was largely elucidated in rats in the 1980s. The basic pathway follows the auditory pathway from the ear up to the nucleus of the lateral lemniscus (LLN) from where it activates a motor centre in the reticular formation. This centre sends descending projections to lower motor neurones of the limbs.

In slightly more detail this corresponds to ear (cochlea) cranial nerve VIII (auditory) cochlear nucleus (ventral/inferior) LLN caudal pontine reticular nucleus (PnC). The whole process has a less than 10 ms latency. There is no involvement of the superior/rostral or inferior/caudal colliculus in the reaction that "twitches" the hindlimbs, but these may be important for adjustment of pinnae and gaze towards the direction of the sound, or for the associated blink.

== Application in occupational settings ==
A study undertaken in 2005 by researchers at the Department of Aviation and Logistics, University of Southern Queensland, looked at the performance of aircraft pilots following unexpected critical events. Analysing a number of recent aircraft accidents, the authors identified the negative impact of the startle response as causal or contributory in these accidents. The authors argued that fear resulting from threat, especially if life-threatening, prompted startle effects which had a serious negative impact on pilots' performances. The study considered training strategies to address this, including exposing pilots to unexpected critical events more often, enabling them to improve their responses.

== See also ==
- Startle-evoked movement
- Escape response
- Jumping Frenchmen of Maine
- Jump scare
- Prepulse inhibition – attenuation of the startle response after a weaker preceding prepulse stimulus
- Surprise (emotion)
- Orienting response
