= Brachium colliculi =

Brachium colliculi may refer to:

- Inferior colliculus (brachium colliculi inferioris), the principal midbrain nucleus of the auditory pathway
- Superior colliculus (brachium colliculi superioris), a paired structure that forms a major component of the vertebrate midbrain
