= Quadrigeminal brachium =

Quadrigeminal brachium may refer to:

- Inferior colliculus, also known by the Latin term inferior quadrigeminal brachium
- Superior colliculus, also known by the Latin term superior quadrigeminal brachium
