= Virtual hammock =

Sound technique

Virtual hammock describes the effect of using structured sound from two isolated, stationary speakers playing into opposite ears to induce the perception of being in the presence of a single sound source which is moving back-and-forth. Rather than relying solely on a variation in sound amplitude of one speaker compared to the other, the Virtual Hammock effect utilizes a shift in phase of the sound wave of one side compared with the other. This stimulates the same physiological response in the Medial Superior Olive (MSO) portion of the brain stem—the first processing stop for auditory nerves—as is induced by an actual moving sound source. Any waveform within certain frequency bounds can be used to achieve this effect. The specific case of playing sinusoidal waves of different frequencies, which creates a continuously varying sensation of the sound source moving from side-to-side, is referred to as a binaural beat. Similarly, playing square waves of two different frequencies will create a sensation of swaying back and forth.

A network of nerves in the MSO detect the place that a threshold is overcome by sending electrochemical impulses along the auditory nerve pathway to the cortex for higher-level processing. These nerves permit the subconscious localization of a sound source; people can identify the direction from which a sound emanates before they can identify the type of source, which is done when the signals reach the cortex. A sound source produces a propagating sound wave that strikes the ear closer to it before traveling an extra distance to strike the opposite ear. The impulses produced in the auditory nerves which conduct signals to the brain for sound processing pass one another in the MSO at a point on the opposite side relative to the location sound source. If a sound impulse originates from a point equidistant to each ear (e.g. directly behind or in front of the head), the neuronal impulses from each ear will pass at a point in the center of the MSO, allowing us to unconsciously identify where a sound source is located. The Virtual Hammock effect is achieved by intentionally manipulating the passing point by shifting the maximum amplitudes of sound waveforms that are directed into each ear.

By way of example, consider a sinusoidal tone of 262 Hz, which corresponds approximately to middle C on a piano, played in one ear, while a slightly different frequency tone of 260 Hz is played to the other ear. When one listens to only one side, that person will hear a constant tone. However, when listening to both sides simultaneously, the hearer perceives the sound of a rhythmic pulse. This perception is similar to hearing a beat frequency on a nominally middle C carrier tone, something that could be achieved by bringing two speakers in near proximity to one another and using them to interfere with pressure waves in the air by playing a 262 Hz tone on one and a 260 Hz tone on the other. The fundamental difference between these two cases is that, in the latter, eardrums are vibrated in a way that includes pulsating beats, whereas in the former the MSO is fooled into reacting in the same way as it would to a single speaker emitting a tone corresponding to a middle C that's swaying back-and-forth.

The difference between these cases is key when considering the propensity of the hearer’s brain to entrain to an induced versus an external frequency: brainwave activity is affected more by a signal that is produced by a part of the brain itself than it is by an external wavering sound that stimulates the ears.

With that in mind, the Virtual Hammock effect can be used to encourage particular brainwave frequencies, and can thus be employed to guide the brain into specific states, including focus (around 20 Hz), drowsiness (10 Hz), and even deep sleep (1 Hz).
