= Trapezoid body =

Part of the auditory pathway

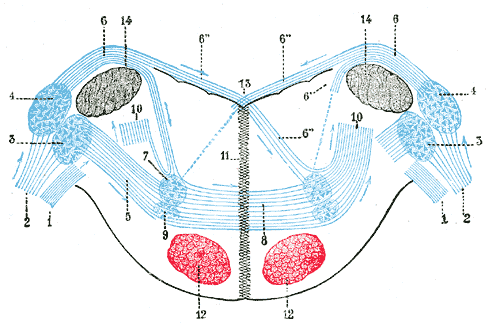
- Terminal nuclei of the cochlear nerve, with their upper connections. (Schematic.) The vestibular nerve with its terminal nuclei and their efferent fibers have been suppressed. On the other hand, in order not to obscure the trapezoid body, the efferent fibers of the terminal nuclei on the right side have been resected in a considerable portion of their extent. The trapezoid body, therefore, shows only one-half of its fibers, viz., those that come from the left. 1. Vestibular nerve, divided at its entrance into the medulla oblongata. 2. Cochlear nerve. 3. Accessory nucleus of acoustic nerve. 4. Tuberculum acusticum. 5. Efferent fibers of accessory nucleus. 6. Efferent fibers of tuberculum acusticum, forming the striae medullares, with 6’, their direct bundle going to the superior olivary nucleus of the same side; 6’’, their decussating bundles going to the superior olivary nucleus of the opposite side. 7. Superior olivary nucleus. 8. Trapezoid body. 9. Trapezoid nucleus. 10. Lateral lemniscus. 11. Raphé. 12. Pyramidal tracts. 13. Fourth ventricle. 14. Inferior peduncle.

Details

Identifiers
- Latin: corpus trapezoideum
- MeSH: D065833
- NeuroNames: 594
- NeuroLex ID: birnlex_707
- TA98: A14.1.05.315
- TA2: 5960
- FMA: 72487

The trapezoid body or ventral acoustic stria is a structure in the pontine tegmentum formed by the crossing-over (decussation) of a portion of the efferent second-order fibers of the ventral cochlear nucleus (anterior cochlear nucleus). After decussating, some of these fibres proceed to ascend in the contralateral lateral lemniscus to reach and terminate in the dorsal nucleus of lateral lemniscus, and inferior colliculus.

The trapezoid body is part of the auditory pathway. It is one of three distinct decussating second-order efferent fiber pathways of the cochlear nuclei (the other two being the dorsal acoustic striae, and intermediate acoustic striae). Not all efferents of the cochlear nuclei decussate though; the partial decussation of the cochear nuclei afferents is thought to be functionally important for sound localization.

== Anatomy ==
The trapezoid body is formed by horizontally-oriented, commissural fibers which are readily identifiable.

=== Projections ===
The fibres of the trapezoid body terminate (synapse) in the (contralateral):

- medial nucleus of trapezoid body (which in turn projects third-order fibres to medial superior olivary nucleus),
- medial superior olivary nucleus,
- dorsal nucleus of lateral lemniscus,
- inferior colliculus.

=== Relations ===
It is situated in (the caudal portion of) the ventral pontine tegmentum at the level of the pontomedullary junction. It is situated immediately dorsal/posterior to the pontine nuclei, and ventral/anterior to the medial lemnisci.
