= Startle-evoked movement =

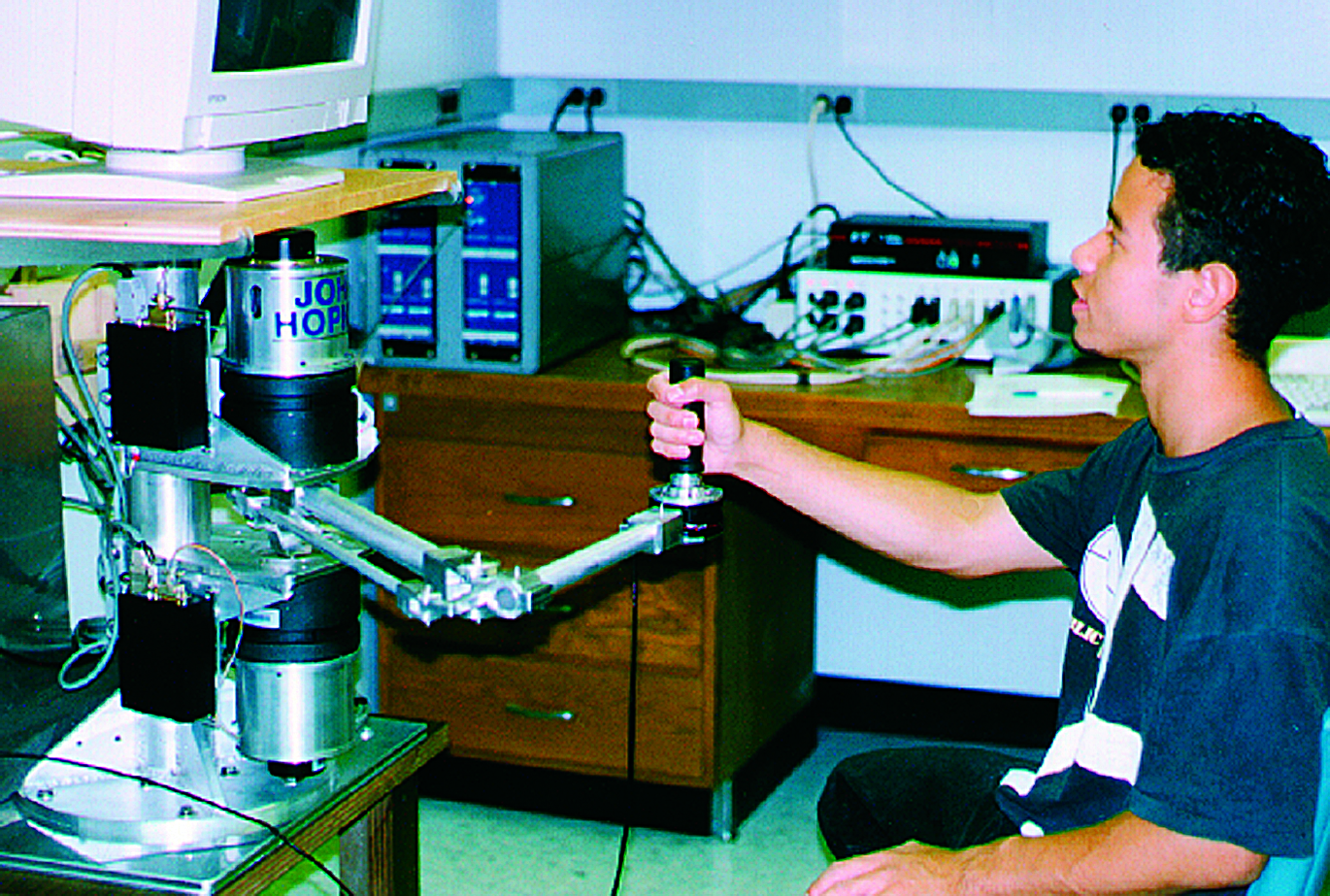
Arm movements measured using a robotic arm

Startle-evoked movement (SEM or startReact) is the involuntary initiation of a planned action in response to a startling stimulus. While the classic startle reflex involves involuntary protective movements, SEMs can be a variety of arm, hand and leg actions including wrist flexion, and rising onto tiptoes. SEMs are performed faster than voluntary movements, but retain the same muscle activation characteristics.

SEM has been used to study how the brain, spinal cord and brainstem can interact to produce movement, and provides a potential avenue of exploration for rehabilitation strategies for those with neurological impairments.

== Neurophysiology ==
=== Reticulospinal tract connection ===
Muscles lacking reticulospinal tract inputs are not susceptible to SEM. The ability to elicit SEM has been used as evidence for reticulospinal tract connections to the muscles governing grasp of the human hand.

=== Neurological impairment ===
People who have suffered cortical damage such as a stroke are capable of performing SEM. In one experiment, SEM caused stroke survivors to perform arm movements as fast as unimpaired people, despite being slower when performing the same action voluntarily. Furthermore, people with pure hereditary spastic paraplegia, a condition effecting the corticospinal tract, are susceptible to SEM as well.

== Involuntary initiation ==
SEM is typified by a reduction in the time to perform an action. Voluntary arm extension, for example, occurs roughly 170 milliseconds after a "Go" signal, while SEMs for arm extension occur between 65 and 77 milliseconds. Due to this faster reaction time, and considering conduction velocity, cortical involvement for these movements is unlikely. Furthermore, movement-related cortical potentials which typically precede voluntary movement execution are absent in SEM.

== Movement preparation ==
In order for SEM to occur, a subject must be waiting to perform an action when a startling stimuli is encountered. Typically, this is achieved by first presenting the subject with a "Ready" signal, indicating that the subject should prepare to conduct a specified action; then playing a startling acoustic stimuli (SAS) before the "Go" signal the subject is anticipating.
