= Spiral ganglion =

Anatomical structure

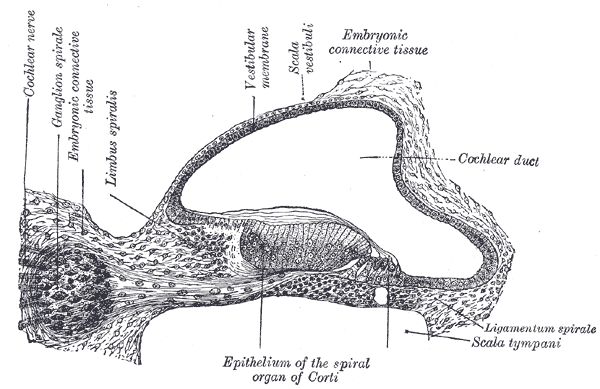
- Transverse section of the cochlear duct of a fetal cat. (Ganglion spirale is labeled at top, second from left.)

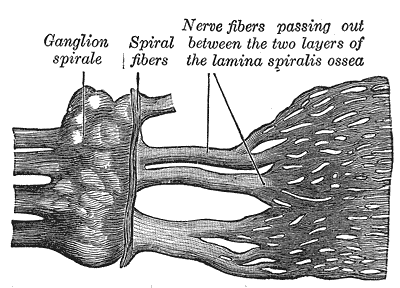
- Part of the cochlear division of the acoustic nerve, highly magnified.

Details

Identifiers
- Latin: ganglion spirale
- MeSH: D013136
- TA98: A15.3.03.125
- TA2: 6319
- TH: H3.11.09.3.04068
- FMA: 53445

The spiral (cochlear) ganglion is a group of neuron cell bodies in the modiolus, the conical central axis of the cochlea. These bipolar neurons innervate the hair cells of the organ of Corti. They project their axons to the ventral and dorsal cochlear nuclei as the cochlear nerve, a branch of the vestibulocochlear nerve (CN VIII).

== Structure ==
Neurons whose cell bodies lie in the spiral ganglion are strung along the bony core of the cochlea, and send fibers (axons) into the central nervous system (CNS). These bipolar neurons are the first neurons in the auditory system to fire an action potential, and supply all of the brain's auditory input. Their dendrites make synaptic contact with the base of hair cells, and their axons are bundled together to form the auditory portion of eighth cranial nerve. The number of neurons in the spiral ganglion is estimated to be about 35,000–50,000.

Two apparent subtypes of spiral ganglion cells exist. Type I spiral ganglion cells comprise the vast majority of spiral ganglion cells (90–95% in cats and 88% in humans), and exclusively innervate the inner hair cells. They are myelinated, bipolar neurons. Type II spiral ganglion cells make up the remainder. In contrast to Type I cells, they are unipolar and unmyelinated in most mammals. They innervate the outer hair cells, with each Type II neuron sampling many (15–20) outer hair cells. In addition, outer hair cells form reciprocal synapses onto Type II spiral ganglion cells, suggesting that the Type II cells have both afferent and efferent roles.

=== Development ===
The rudiment of the cochlear nerve appears about the end of the third week as a group of ganglion cells closely applied to the cephalic edge of the auditory vesicle. The ganglion gradually splits into two parts, the vestibular ganglion and the spiral ganglion. The axons of neurons in the spiral ganglion travel to the brainstem, forming the cochlear nerve.

== Gallery ==
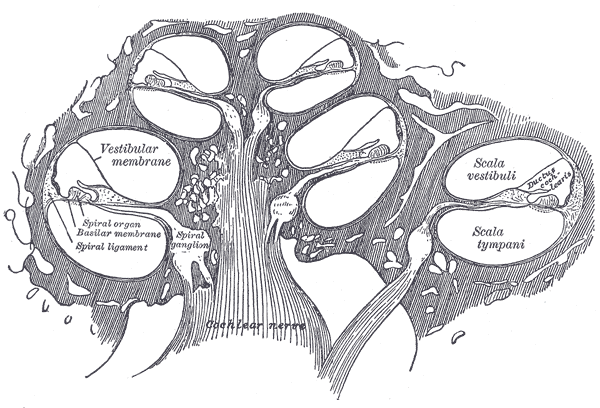
Diagrammatic longitudinal section of the cochlea

Organ of Corti
