= Interaural time difference =

Difference in time that it takes a sound to travel between two ears

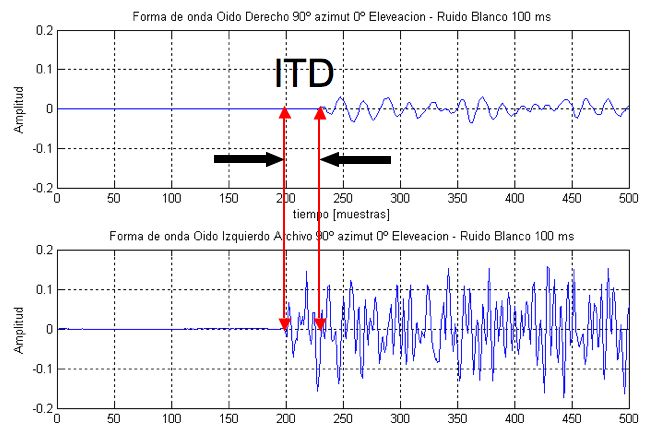
Interaural time difference (ITD) between left (top) and right (bottom) ears. (sound source: 100 ms white noise from 90° azimuth, 0° elevation)

The interaural time difference (or ITD) when concerning humans or animals, is the difference in arrival time of a sound between two ears. It is important in the localization of sounds, as it provides a cue to the direction or angle of the sound source from the head. If a signal arrives at the head from one side, the signal has further to travel to reach the far ear than the near ear. This pathlength difference results in a time difference between the sound's arrivals at the ears, which is detected and aids the process of identifying the direction of sound source.

When a signal is produced in the horizontal plane, its angle in relation to the head is referred to as its azimuth, with 0 degrees (0°) azimuth being directly in front of the listener, 90° to the right, and 180° being directly behind.

== Different methods for measuring ITDs ==
- For an abrupt stimulus such as a click, onset ITDs are measured. An onset ITD is the time difference between the onset of the signal reaching two ears.
- A transient ITD can be measured when using a random noise stimulus and is calculated as the time difference between a set peak of the noise stimulus reaching the ears.
- If the stimulus used is not abrupt but periodic, then ongoing ITDs are measured. This is where the waveforms reaching both ears can be shifted in time until they perfectly match up, and the size of this shift is recorded as the ITD. This shift is known as the interaural phase difference (IPD) and can be used for measuring the ITDs of periodic inputs such as pure tones and amplitude modulated stimuli. An amplitude-modulated stimulus IPD can be assessed by looking at either the waveform envelope or the waveform fine structure.

== Duplex theory ==
The duplex theory proposed by Lord Rayleigh (1907) provides an explanation for the ability of humans to localise sounds by time differences between the sounds reaching each ear (ITDs) and differences in sound level entering the ears (interaural level differences, ILDs). But there still lies a question whether ITD or ILD is prominent.

The duplex theory states that ITDs are used to localise low-frequency sounds, in particular, while ILDs are used in the localisation of high-frequency sound inputs. However, the frequency ranges for which the auditory system can use ITDs and ILDs significantly overlap, and most natural sounds will have both high- and low-frequency components, so that the auditory system will in most cases have to combine information from both ITDs and ILDs to judge the location of a sound source. A consequence of this duplex system is that it is also possible to generate so-called "cue trading" or "time–intensity trading" stimuli on headphones, where ITDs pointing to the left are offset by ILDs pointing to the right, so the sound is perceived as coming from the midline.

A limitation of the duplex theory is that the theory does not completely explain directional hearing, as no explanation is given for the ability to distinguish between a sound source directly in front and behind. Also the theory only relates to localising sounds in the horizontal plane around the head. The theory also does not take into account the use of the pinna in localisation (Gelfand, 2004).

Experiments conducted by Woodworth (1938) tested the duplex theory by using a solid sphere to model the shape of the head and measuring the ITDs as a function of azimuth for different frequencies. The model used had a distance between the two ears of approximately 22–23 cm. Initial measurements found that there was a maximum time delay of approximately 660 μs when the sound source was placed at directly 90° azimuth to one ear. This time delay correlates to the wavelength of a sound input with a frequency of 1500 Hz. The results concluded that when a sound played had a frequency less than 1500 Hz, the wavelength is greater than this maximum time delay between the ears. Therefore, there is a phase difference between the sound waves entering the ears providing acoustic localisation cues. With a sound input with a frequency closer to 1500 Hz the wavelength of the sound wave is similar to the natural time delay. Therefore, due to the size of the head and the distance between the ears there is a reduced phase difference, so localisations errors start to be made. When a high-frequency sound input is used with a frequency greater than 1500 Hz, the wavelength is shorter than the distance between the ears, a head shadow is produced, and ILD provide cues for the localisation of this sound.

Feddersen et al. (1957) also conducted experiments taking measurements on how ITDs alter with changing the azimuth of the loudspeaker around the head at different frequencies. But unlike the Woodworth experiments, human subjects were used rather than a model of the head. The experiment results agreed with the conclusion made by Woodworth about ITDs. The experiments also concluded that there is no difference in ITDs when sounds are provided from directly in front or behind at 0° and 180° azimuth. The explanation for this is that the sound is equidistant from both ears. Interaural time differences alter as the loudspeaker is moved around the head. The maximum ITD of 660 μs occurs when a sound source is positioned at 90° azimuth to one ear.

== Current findings ==
Starting in 1948, the prevailing theory on interaural time differences centered on the idea that inputs from the medial superior olive differentially process inputs from the ipsilateral and contralateral side relative to the sound. This is accomplished through a discrepancy in arrival time of excitatory inputs into the medial superior olive, based on differential conductance of the axons, which allows both sounds to ultimately converge at the same time through neurons with complementary intrinsic properties.

Franken et al. attempted to further elucidate the mechanisms underlying ITD in mammalian brains. One experiment they performed was to isolate discrete inhibitory post-synaptic potentials and try to determine whether inhibitory inputs to the superior olive were allowing the faster excitatory input to delay firing until the two signals were synced. However, after blocking EPSPs with a glutamate receptor blocker, they determine that the size of inhibitory inputs was too marginal to appear to play a significant role in phase locking. This was verified when the experimenters blocked inhibitory input and still saw clear phase locking of the excitatory inputs in their absence. This led them to the theory that in-phase excitatory inputs are summated such that the brain can process sound localization by counting the number of action potentials that arise from various magnitudes of summated depolarization.

Franken et al. also examined anatomical and functional patterns within the superior olive to clarify previous theories about the rostrocaudal axis serving as a source of tonotopy. Their results showed a significant correlation between tuning frequency and relative position along the dorsoventral axis, while they saw no distinguishable pattern of tuning frequency on the rostrocaudal axis.

Lastly, they went on to further explore the driving forces behind the interaural time difference, specifically whether the process is simply the alignment of inputs that is processed by a coincidence detector, or whether the process is more complicated. Evidence from Franken et al. shows that the processing is affected by inputs that precede the binaural signal, which would alter the functioning of voltage-gated sodium and potassium channels to shift the membrane potential of the neuron. Furthermore, the shift is dependent on the frequency tuning of each neuron, ultimately creating a more complex confluence and analysis of sound. These findings provide several pieces of evidence that contradict existing theories about binaural audition.

== The anatomy of the ITD pathway ==
The auditory nerve fibres, known as the afferent nerve fibres, carry information from the organ of Corti to the brainstem and brain. Auditory afferent fibres consist of two types of fibres called type I and type II fibres. Type I fibres innervate the base of one or two inner hair cells and Type II fibres innervate the outer hair cells. Both leave the organ of Corti through an opening called the habenula perforata. The type I fibres are thicker than the type II fibres and may also differ in how they innervate the inner hair cells. Neurons with large calyceal endings ensure preservation of timing information throughout the ITD pathway.

Next in the pathway is the cochlear nucleus, which receives mainly ipsilateral (that is, from the same side) afferent input. The cochlear nucleus has three distinct anatomical divisions, known as the antero-ventral cochlear nucleus (AVCN), postero-ventral cochlear nucleus (PVCN) and dorsal cochlear nucleus (DCN) and each have different neural innervations.

The AVCN contains predominant bushy cells, with one or two profusely branching dendrites; it is thought that bushy cells may process the change in the spectral profile of complex stimuli. The AVCN also contain cells with more complex firing patterns than bushy cells called multipolar cells, these cells have several profusely branching dendrites and irregular shaped cell bodies. Multipolar cells are sensitive to changes in acoustic stimuli and in particular, onset and offset of sounds, as well as changes in intensity and frequency. The axons of both cell types leave the AVCN as large tract called the ventral acoustic stria, which forms part of the trapezoid body and travels to the superior olivary complex.

A group of nuclei in pons make up the superior olivary complex (SOC). This is the first stage in auditory pathway to receive input from both cochleas, which is crucial for our ability to localise the sounds source in the horizontal plane. The SOC receives input from cochlear nuclei, primarily the ipsilateral and contralateral AVCN. Four nuclei make up the SOC but only the medial superior olive (MSO) and the lateral superior olive (LSO) receive input from both cochlear nuclei.

The MSO is made up of neurons which receive input from the low-frequency fibers of the left and right AVCN. The result of having input from both cochleas is an increase in the firing rate of the MSO units. The neurons in the MSO are sensitive to the difference in the arrival time of sound at each ear, also known as the interaural time difference (ITD). Research shows that if stimulation arrives at one ear before the other, many of the MSO units will have increased discharge rates. The axons from the MSO continue to higher parts of the pathway via the ipsilateral lateral lemniscus tract.(Yost, 2000)

The lateral lemniscus (LL) is the main auditory tract in the brainstem connecting SOC to the inferior colliculus. The dorsal nucleus of the lateral lemniscus (DNLL) is a group of neurons separated by lemniscus fibres, these fibres are predominantly destined for the inferior colliculus (IC). In studies using an unanesthetized rabbit the DNLL was shown to alter the sensitivity of the IC neurons and may alter the coding of interaural timing differences (ITDs) in the IC.(Kuwada et al., 2005) The ventral nucleus of the lateral lemniscus (VNLL) is a chief source of input to the inferior colliculus. Research using rabbits shows the discharge patterns, frequency tuning and dynamic ranges of VNLL neurons supply the inferior colliculus with a variety of inputs, each enabling a different function in the analysis of sound.(Batra & Fitzpatrick, 2001) In the inferior colliculus (IC) all the major ascending pathways from the olivary complex and the central nucleus converge. The IC is situated in the midbrain and consists of a group of nuclei the largest of these is the central nucleus of inferior colliculus (CNIC). The greater part of the ascending axons forming the lateral lemniscus will terminate in the ipsilateral CNIC however a few follow the commissure of Probst and terminate on the contralateral CNIC. The axons of most of the CNIC cells form the brachium of IC and leave the brainstem to travel to the ipsilateral thalamus. Cells in different parts of the IC tend to be monaural, responding to input from one ear, or binaural and therefore respond to bilateral stimulation.

The spectral processing that occurs in the AVCN and the ability to process binaural stimuli, as seen in the SOC, are replicated in the IC. Lower centres of the IC extract different features of the acoustic signal such as frequencies, frequency bands, onsets, offsets, changes in intensity and localisation. The integration or synthesis of acoustic information is thought to start in the CNIC.(Yost, 2000)

== Effect of a hearing loss ==
A number of studies have looked into the effect of hearing loss on interaural time differences. In their review of localisation and lateralisation studies, Durlach, Thompson, and Colburn (1981), cited in Moore (1996) found a "clear trend for poor localization and lateralization in people with unilateral or asymmetrical cochlear damage". This is due to the difference in performance between the two ears. In support of this, they did not find significant localisation problems in individuals with symmetrical cochlear losses.

In addition to this, studies have been conducted into the effect of hearing loss on the threshold for interaural time differences. The normal human threshold for detection of an ITD is up to a time difference of 10 μs. Studies by Gabriel, Koehnke, & Colburn (1992), Häusler, Colburn, & Marr (1983) and Kinkel, Kollmeier, & Holube (1991) (cited by Moore, 1996) have shown that there can be great differences between individuals regarding binaural performance. It was found that unilateral or asymmetric hearing losses can increase the threshold of ITD detection in patients. This was also found to apply to individuals with symmetrical hearing losses when detecting ITDs in narrowband signals. However, ITD thresholds seem to be normal for those with symmetrical losses when listening to broadband sounds.

== See also ==
- Sound localization
