= Calyx of Held =

Synapse in the mammalian auditory central nervous system

Calyx of Held microstructure

The calyx of Held is a particularly large excitatory synapse in the mammalian auditory nervous system, so named after Hans Held who first described it in his 1893 article Die centrale Gehörleitung because of its resemblance to the calyx of a flower. Globular bushy cells in the anteroventral cochlear nucleus (AVCN) send axons to the contralateral medial nucleus of the trapezoid body (MNTB), where they synapse via these calyces on MNTB principal cells. These principal cells then project to the ipsilateral lateral superior olive (LSO), where they inhibit postsynaptic neurons and provide a basis for interaural level detection (ILD), required for high frequency sound localization. This synapse has been described as the largest in the brain.

The related endbulb of Held is also a large axon terminal synapse (15–30 μm in diameter) found in another auditory brainstem structure, namely the anteroventral cochlear nucleus (AVCN). As with the calyces, these synapses promote fast, efficient information transfer.

The calyx of Held and endbulb of Held hold vesicles containing glutamate on the presynaptic terminal; the vesicles are released upon stimulation (originating in the cochlea and AVCN). The glutamate then binds to two known glutamate receptors, AMPA- and NMDA receptors, rapidly initiating action potentials in the post-synaptic cell.

Commonly used in research due to its large size, the calyx of Held has been used to understand a variety of mechanisms related to development of, and vesicle release of the synapse.

== Function ==
The calyx of Held is a part of the auditory system, connecting the globular bushy cells (GBCs) of the anteroventral cochlear nucleus to the principal neurons of the medial nucleus of the trapezoid body (MNTB). As a synapse, the function of the calyx of Held is to transmit the signal from the GBCs to the principal neurons of the MNTB, which are glycinergic, thus hyperpolarizing cells in the lateral superior olive (LSO) nuclei and producing inhibitory effects. As a result of its role in stimulating the principal neurons of the MNTB, the primary function of the calyx of Held is to allow differentiation between temporal activation of the cochlear hair cells that are important in sound localization (interaural level detection).

Interaural level detection is possible through the calyx system due to the large relative size of the GBCs, the calyx of Held, and the principal neurons of the MNTB. The neurons in the LSO are especially important in discerning these interaural level differences. The large diameter of the bushy cell axons allows the inhibitory signal produced by the MNTB neurons to reach the SOC approximately 0.2 ms later than the ipsilateral excitation. This ~0.2 millisecond time delay difference is short enough to allow comparing the levels from the two sides to assess ILD, especially at high frequencies, and also allows some ITD sensitivity, at frequencies low enough to have cycle-by-cycle phase locking.

== Structure ==
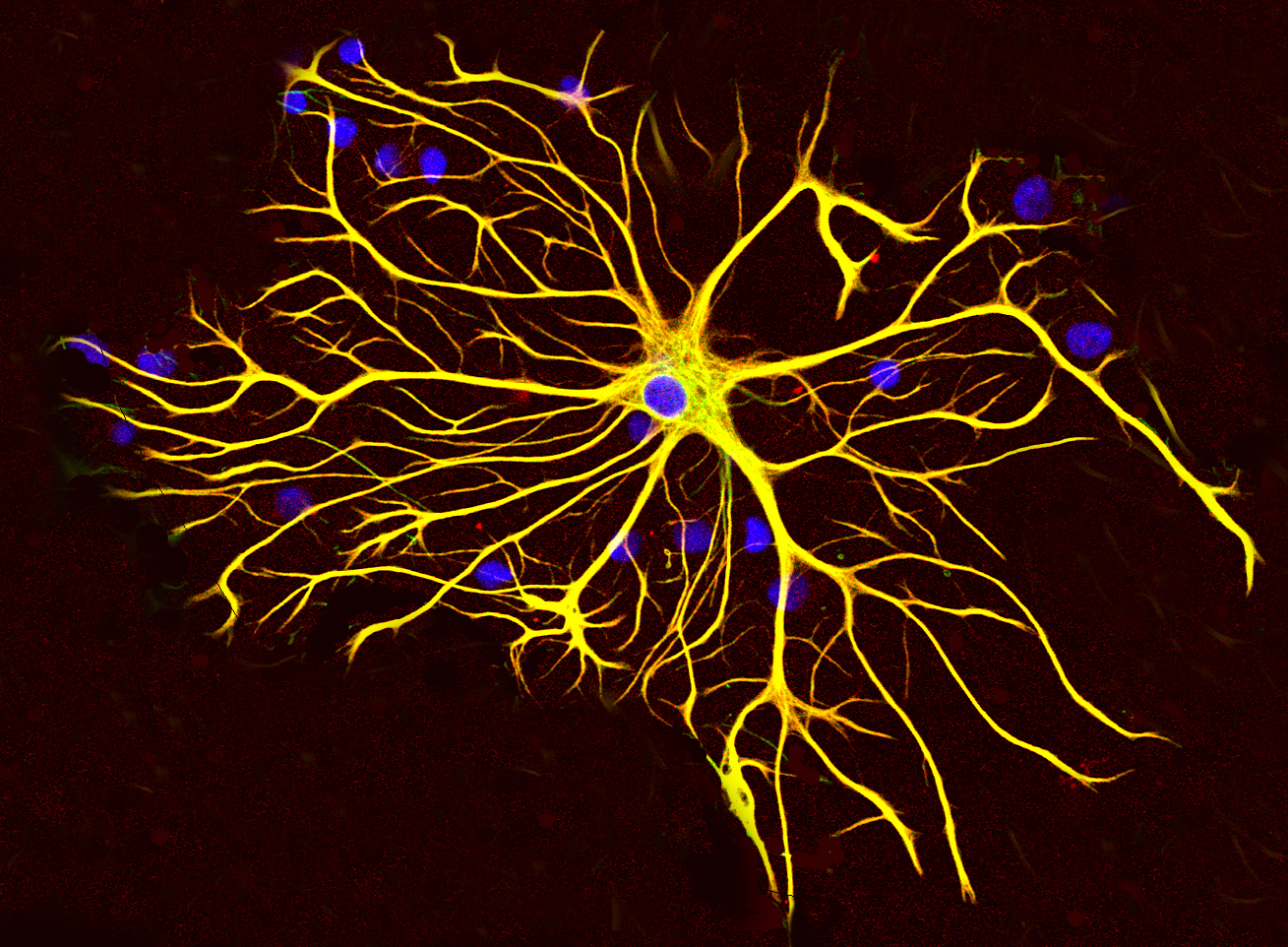
An astrocytic cell from rat brain grown in tissue culture and stained with antibodies to GFAP (red) and vimentin (green). Both proteins are present in large amounts in the intermediate filaments of this cell, so the cell appears yellow. The blue material shows DNA visualized with DAPI stain, and reveals the nuclei of the astrocyte and other cells.

For every MNTB principal neuron there is one calyx, and for most GBC axons there is only a single calyx, although there are exceptions to this pairing. This in general creates a one-to-one ratio between GBCs, the calyces of Held, and the principal neurons. The calyx of Held encompasses the principal neuron with a distinct morphology: branching of the calyx allows the creation of second- and third-order networks. Each branch establishes a connection with the principal neuron, establishing a large number of active zones. This is unusual for synaptic terminals in the brain, as most create a single active zone. Each calyx contains anywhere from 300 to 700 active zones, and in each of the active zones there are about 100 glutamate-containing vesicles with about 3 docked vesicles at a time. These vesicles are large, consistent with the findings regarding quantal size in other adult synapses. Dense-core vesicles, usually containing neuropeptides, are also present, but further research is needed to determine their content and function.

To maintain the structure of the synapse, as with other synapses, there are many microtubules. The calyx has a large number of microtubules at the base of the terminal. These microtubules carry out a variety of functions, such as providing stability to the synapse, restricting the distribution of the synaptic vesicles, and localizing the mitochondria. Mitochondria have three important functions at the synaptic terminal: allowing the synapse to meet metabolic needs (especially for removal of calcium after depolarization), buffering the calcium by allowing uptake of calcium into the mitochondria, and providing energy for glutamate synthesis.

Various glial cells are also associated with the calyx of Held. Two types of glial cells surround the calyx: astrocytes and NG_{2} glial cells. The astrocytes express glutamate transporters to remove glutamate from the synapse. This is the only known mechanism for removal of glutamate from the synapse. The NG_{2} glial cells express AMPA receptors.

== Development ==
=== General development ===
At postnatal day two (P2), the immature rat calyx of Held is formed, easily distinguished by its characteristic sealed-spoon morphology. The primary synaptic contacts that form the calyx are assembled between neurons of the MNTB (medial nucleus of the trapezoid body) and VCN (ventral cochlear nerve), eventually connecting with one another by projecting across the midline of the two areas. These associations begin to appear immediately after VCN neurons have been generated; one can observe the earliest formation of these contacts around embryonic day 17 (E17). These neuronal connections, which make up an important area of the cochlea, form branches with one another that terminate in the calyx of Held. Over the course of the next two to three weeks, the neuronal contacts that first formed the embryonic calyx evolve in shape and function, culminating in a mature calyx that facilitates the consistent, rapid spread of signals in the MNTB-VCN area.

A select few processes occur during early neuronal development in order to ensure proper calyx formation, specifically through the influence of Fibroblastic Growth Factor (FGF), transcription factor Math5, neural cell recognition molecule NB-2, and ephrin (Eph) proteins in cells. Math1/Math5 and FGF are two regulators essential for appropriate growth and development of the cochlear nucleus complex, which comprises both the ventral cochlear nucleus (VCN) and the dorsal cochlear nucleus (DCN). Sufficient FGF levels ensure proper morphology of the cochlear nuclei, while Math5 insures correct size and processing of the cochlear nucleus. Math1, another transcription factor, is necessary for the appearance of VCN neurons in the cochlear extramural stream as well as the neurons of the superior olivary complex. NB-2 also assists in the advancement of the formation of the calyx of Held, as well as contributing to the upkeep of the contralateral MNTB. The combined effects of these three molecules with one another illustrate the fact that there are many families of proteins involved in proper signaling and formation of the calyx.

Structure of a typical neuron

Additionally, Eph proteins are integral for further auditory circuit system development after initial embryonic calyx formation. One characteristic that distinguishes Eph proteins and their receptors from other signaling systems is their ability to transmit information bidirectionally. Forward and reverse signaling in VCN and MNTB cells is essential for the proper number and formation of VCN and ipsilateral MNTB projections in the calyx. Eph proteins also ensure that while axons pass through the ipsilateral MNTB, branching and final termination of these projections only occur in the contralateral MNTB, possibly because the proteins are only targeted towards specific regions on the axons.

Overall, there are two ultrastructural changes that occur in the calyx of Held. The first is that in the second week of development, myelination of the VCN axons in the MNTB increases. This prominent growth in myelin corresponds to the chronological development of the signaling circuit and adaptation of the calyx. The second ultrastructural change involves the principal neurons of the MNTBs, whose cell bodies and nuclei increase in surface area due to enlargement. This is a direct result of individual, larger postsynaptic densities breaking up into smaller, multiple densities.

=== Potassium channel development ===
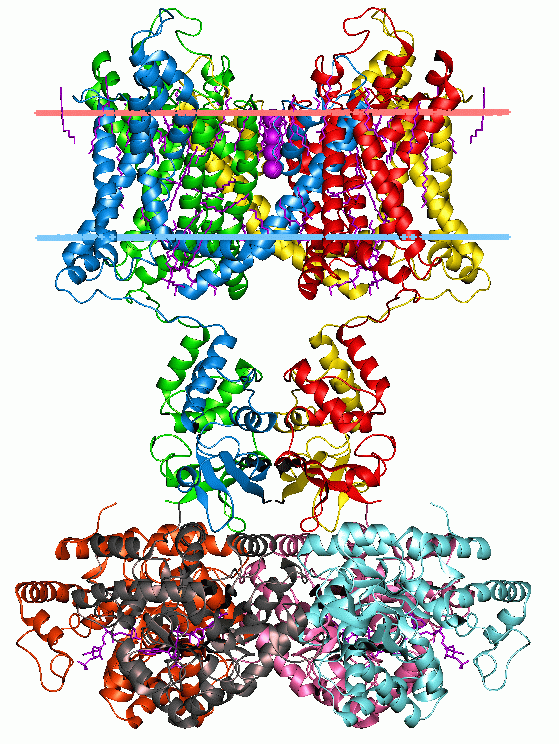
Potassium Channel - 2r9r opm

Potassium channels are vital in conducting the presynaptic action potential. The calyx contains several types of potassium channels, each differing in location and sensitivity. Both low-threshold K^{+} channels and high-threshold delayed rectifier-type K^{+} channels are present in presynaptic neurons. There are four low-threshold K^{+} channels present: K_{v}1.1, K_{v}1.2, K_{v}1.3, and K_{v}7.5. K_{v}1.1 and K_{v}1.2 are located in the transition zone between the axon and the terminal, while K_{v}1.3 K_{v}7.5 are located in the calyx. There is a calcium activated potassium channel expressed in the calyx, however this type of channel does not contribute to neurotransmitter release.

Within the span of one week, mice subjects (P7 to P14) showed that the density of the K_{v}1 and K_{v}3 low threshold channels increases, which in turn affect the kinetics of the channels.

=== Sodium channel development ===
Changes in sodium channels during maturation allow increased presynaptic action potential speed. Here, action potentials become faster due to the ability of sodium channels to recover quicker following the conduction. Evidence shows that the expression in the alpha subunit of Na_{V}1.6, a specific type of sodium channel, is responsible for the increased speed in transmission. Na_{V}1.2, another sodium channel expressed in the axons and nodes, is known to exhibit slower kinetics.

In order to compensate for the myelination (increased capacitance), leading up to the calyx at the last node (the area between the myelin sheath) before the axon terminal contains a high density of Na^{+} channels in order to allow a large influx (inward flow) of sodium to trigger the voltage-gated calcium channels to open in the presynaptic terminal, causing a calcium influx.

=== Calcium channel development ===
In immature calyces of Held, calcium (Ca^{2+}) ions enter MNTB neurons through N-, P/Q-, and R-type Ca^{2+} channels, yet in mature calyces, Ca^{2+} influx occurs primarily through P/Q-type channels. N- and R- type Ca^{2+} receptors are less apt to trigger vesicle release, as these receptor types are further away from release sites. Therefore, calcium ions entering the N- and R- type channels increase calcium ion concentration in areas of lesser importance to the function of the calyx.

Blocking of the Ca^{2+} channels can occur through the use of G protein-coupled receptors, activated by the following neurotransmitters:

- Noradrenaline (norepinephrine)
- Serotonin
- γ-aminobutyric acid (GABA)
- Glutamate (glutamic acid)
- Adenosine

Changes occur in the ion channels to encourage faster transmission:

- Na^{+} and K^{+} channels change to allow pre- and postsynaptic action potentials to be faster
- K_{v}3 channels also activate much more rapidly.
- Size of the presynaptic Ca^{2+} currents increases.
- Gating mechanics of the glutamate receptors becomes faster

Noradrenaline

Serotonin

GABA

Glutamic acid

Adenosine

=== Ligand-gated channel development ===
Aside from the glutamate receptor, only a few other ligand-gated channels have been found in the immature calyces of Held: the ionotropic GABA_{A} and the glycine receptor. These receptors allow chloride (Cl^{−}) to flow across the membrane, and due to the high chloride concentration in the terminal these receptors are depolarizing.

=== Fenestration ===
Between the second and third postnatal weeks, around the time of hearing onset, the calyx of Held develops its characteristic, highly fenestrated (many openings) appearance. Fenestration results in the membrane being reduced to numerous small compartments, which increases surface-to-volume ratio of the calyx of Held. As the membrane becomes increasingly pinched into these bulb-like structures, synaptic vesicles are further grouped into these spaces, resulting in an increased number of docked vesicles.

To compensate for the available spaces in the calyx, glial cells with glutamate receptors and transports are used to fill open spaces, ensuring efficient uptake of glutamate in the synapse.

== Mechanism ==
(A) Presynaptic Neuron. (B) Postsynaptic Neuron. (1) Mitochondria. (2) Synaptic vesicle full of neurotransmitter. (3) Autoreceptor. (4) Synaptic Cleft. (5) Neurotransmitter Receptor. (6) Calcium Channel. (7) Fused vesicle releasing neurotransmitter. (8) Neurotransmitter re-uptake pump

As a synapse, the calyx of Held follows a mechanism similar to other synapses. A thorough description can be found under neurotransmission.

=== Calcium influx ===
Calcium influx for the immature calyx of Held is mediated by N-, P/Q-, and R-type calcium channels; however upon maturation only P/Q-type calcium channels become dominant. Upon calcium influx, the immature calyx of Held is highly reactive due to its small calcium buffer ability – this causes the release of glutamate even at low levels of calcium influx. Within the terminal, as with other synapses, two calcium ions bind to synaptotagmin in order to trigger vesicle release – for the calyces of Held, glutamate is released in the vesicles. In addition to vesicle release, calcium ions signal for the calyx terminal to return to the inactive state. Upon calcium influx, a cAMP-response element binding protein (CREB) is phosphorylated, altering the potassium concentrations within the cell to return the terminal to an inactive state. Removal of the calcium is done through various methods including: being removed from the terminal, being taken up into mitochondria, or binding to calcium-binding proteins such as parvalbumin and calretinin.

=== Presynaptic inhibition ===
Retrograde signaling is necessary in the calyx of Held to regulate the calcium levels within the presynaptic terminal. The activation of metabotropic glutamate receptors (mGluRs) activates a G-protein secondary messenger that interacts with the P/Q-type calcium channels to decrease conductance. In addition, the vesicle pool size is increased and the probability of release is decreased. Other methods for presynaptic inhibition include noradrenaline, serotonin, and adenosine – these methods are only seen in immature calyces of Held.

=== Postsynaptic glutamate receptors ===
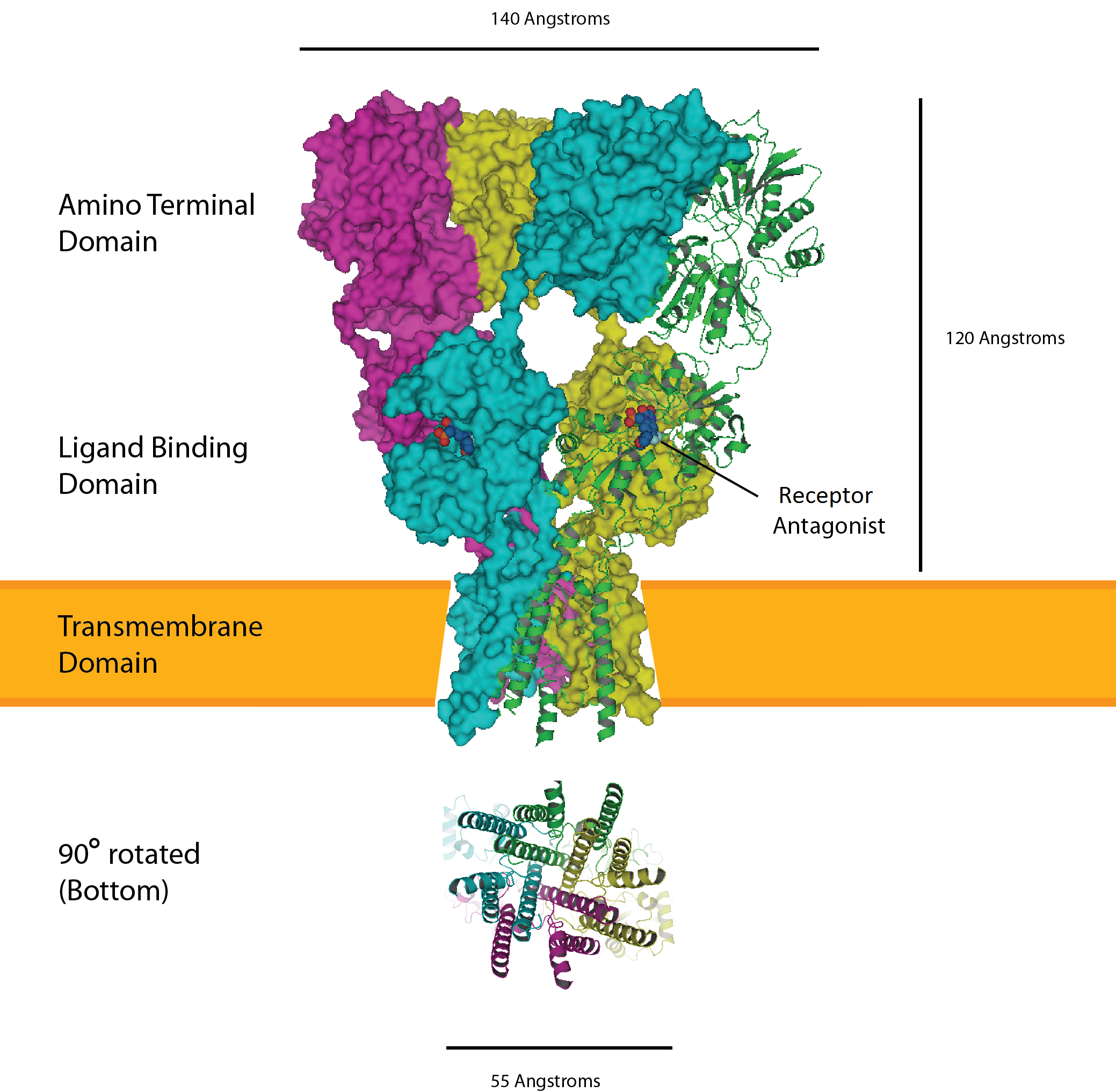
The AMPA receptor bound to a glutamate antagonist showing the amino terminal, ligand binding, and transmembrane domain, PDB 3KG2

Glutamate receptors are present on the postsynaptic terminal – the two types include ionotropic AMPA- and NMDA receptors. As an excitatory neurotransmitter, glutamate almost always causes an action potential to be triggered on the postsynaptic side – further encouraged by low internal sodium of the principal neurons. In the mature calyx, the AMPA receptors are concentrated on the principal neuron as to localize the transmission for greater action potential probability. Also note, the NMDA-type glutamate receptors contributions decrease after the onset of hearing.

=== Presynaptic vesicle endocytosis ===
The mechanism behind synaptic vesicle endocytosis changes as the calyx becomes more mature. Calmodulin and calcineurin in their active form are required for vesicle endocytosis in an immature calyx; however, in the mature calyx neither calmodulin nor calcineurin are necessary. Rather, the process is mediated by the energy created by hydrolysis of GTP. In order to load the glutamate into vesicles at the terminal two proteins are used: vesicular glutamate transporter 1 (VGLUT1) and VGLUT2.

=== Response ===
The high-threshold potassium channels in the postsynaptic membrane allow rapid repolarization of the target neuron. The low-threshold potassium channels of the postsynaptic neuron reduce the excitability of the neuron in order to restrict its activation to only the largest synaptic input(s).

== Research importance ==
The calyx of Held has become a popular model system within the field of neurobiology. The presence of this synapse in the mammalian nervous system has allowed for direct research within a mammalian model and the large size increases the ease of electrophysiological recording. For these reasons it has been popular in understanding transmitter release.

Specifically, the calyx of Held is used because of:

1. the ease of presynaptic patch-clamp recordings.
2. the ability to monitor transmitter release while measuring pre- and postsynaptic effects.
3. the ease of imaging and measuring capacitance.
4. the use of viruses to observe the calyx of Held as an exogenous expression system.
5. the possibility to do in vivo experiments.
