= Dorsal cochlear nucleus =

Neuron cluster in the brainstem

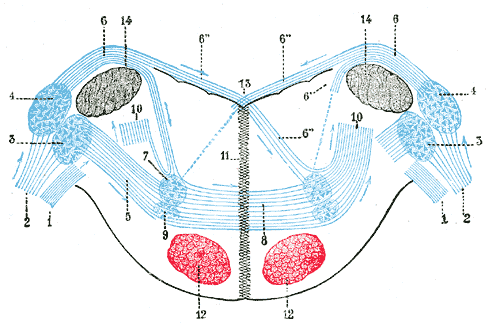
- Dorsal cochlear nucleus is #4, at upper left

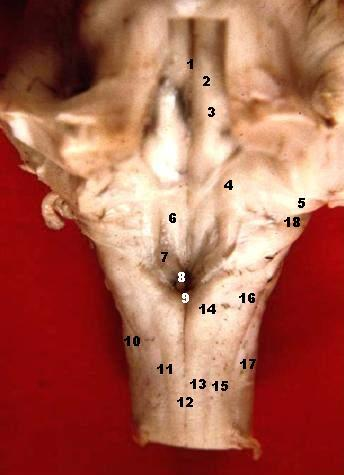
- Human caudal brainstem posterior view (Dorsal cochlear nucleus is #5)

Details

Identifiers
- Latin: nucleus cochlearis posterior
- NeuroNames: 721
- NeuroLex ID: birnlex_2569
- TA98: A14.1.04.248
- TA2: 6007
- FMA: 54624

The dorsal cochlear nucleus (DCN, also known as the "tuberculum acusticum") is a cortex-like structure on the dorso-lateral surface of the brainstem. Along with the ventral cochlear nucleus (VCN), it forms the cochlear nucleus (CN), where all auditory nerve fibers from the cochlea form their first synapses.

== Anatomy ==
The DCN differs from the ventral portion of the CN as it not only projects to the central nucleus (a subdivision) of the inferior colliculus (CIC), but also receives efferent innervation from the auditory cortex, superior olivary complex and the inferior colliculus. The cytoarchitecture and neurochemistry of the DCN is similar to that of the cerebellum, an important concept in theories of DCN function. Thus, the DCN is thought to be involved with more complex auditory processing, rather than merely transferring information.

The pyramidal cells or giant cells are a major cell grouping of the DCN. These cells are the target of two different input systems. The first system arises from the auditory nerve, and carries acoustic information. The second set of inputs is relayed through a set of small granule cells in the cochlear nucleus. There are also a great number of neighbouring cartwheel cells. The granule cells in turn are the target of a number of different inputs, including both those involved in auditory processing and, at least in lower mammals, somatosensory inputs associated with the head, the ear, and the jaw.

Projections from DCN principal cells form the dorsal acoustic stria, which ultimately terminate in the CIC. This projection overlaps with that of the lateral superior olive (LSO) in a well-defined manner, where they form the primary excitatory input for ICC type O units.

== Physiology ==
Principal cells in the DCN have very complex frequency intensity tuning curves. Classified as cochlear nucleus type IV cells, the firing rate may be very rapid in response to a low intensity sound at one frequency and then fall below the spontaneous rate with only a small increment in stimulus frequency or intensity. The firing rate may then increase with another increment in intensity or frequency. Type IV cells are excited by wide band noise, and particularly excited by a noise-notch stimulus directly below the cell's best frequency (BF).

While the VCN bushy cells aid in the location of a sound stimulus on the horizontal axis via their inputs to the superior olivary complex, type IV cells may participate in localization of the sound stimulus on the vertical axis. The pinna selectively amplifies frequencies, resulting in reduced sound energy at specific frequencies in certain regions of space. The complicated firing patterns of type IV cells makes them especially suited to detecting these notches, and with the combined power of these two localization systems, an ordinary person can locate where a firework explodes without the use of their eyes.

Somatosensory inputs inhibit type IV cell activity, possibly silencing their activity during head and pinna movements. While this has not been studied extensively, it may play an important role in sound source localization in elevation. A similar effect is seen in the visual system in an effect known as change blindness.

Current auditory models of the DCN employ a two-inhibitor model. Type IV cells receive excitation directly from the auditory nerve, and are inhibited by type II (vertical) cells and a wide band inhibitor (onset-c cells).
