= Spinal accessory nucleus =

Neuron cluster of the spinal cord

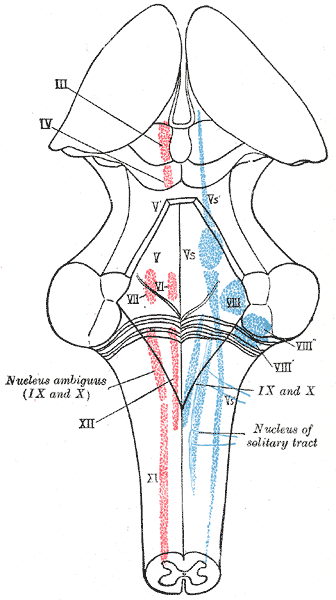
- The cranial nerve nuclei schematically represented; dorsal view. Motor nuclei in red; sensory in blue. (Spinal accessory nucleus is at "XI".)

Details

Identifiers
- Latin: nucleus nervi accessorii, nucleus spinalis nervi accessorii
- NeuroNames: 1708

The spinal accessory nucleus lies within the cervical spinal cord (C1-C5) in the posterolateral aspect of the anterior horn. The nucleus ambiguus is classically said to provide the "cranial component" of the accessory nerve. However, the very existence of this cranial component has been recently questioned and seen as contributing exclusively to the vagus nerve.

The terminology continues to be used in describing both human anatomy, and that of other animals.

== Additional images ==
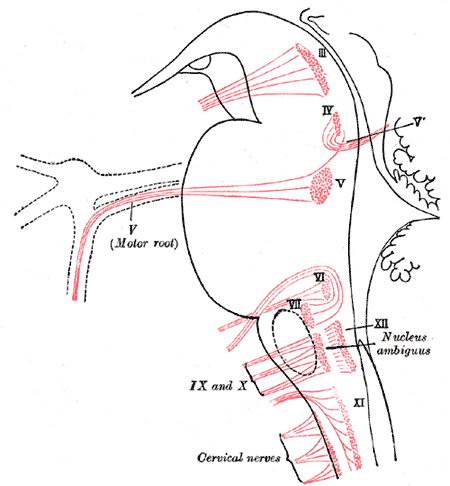
Nuclei of origin of cranial motor nerves schematically represented; lateral view.

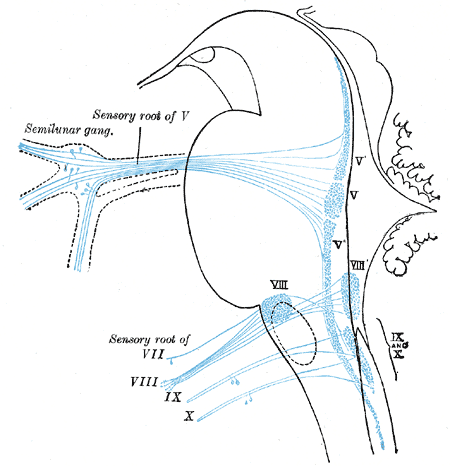
Primary terminal nuclei of the afferent (sensory) cranial nerves schematically represented; lateral view.
