= Franssen effect =

The Franssen effect is an auditory illusion where the listener incorrectly localizes a sound. It was found in 1960 by Nico Valentinus Franssen (1926–1979), a Dutch physicist and inventor. There are two classical experiments, which are related to the Franssen effect, called Franssen effect F1 and Franssen effect F2.

== Franssen effect F1 ==
There are two loudspeakers to the left and right of the listener. Each is about 1 meter in distance from the listener, at approximately 45° angles.

The left speaker suddenly begins to produce a sharp pure tone. The two speakers are complementary to each other: i.e., as one increases, the other decreases. The left one is decreased exponentially, and the right speaker becomes the main source of the sound. The listener mistakenly perceives the sound as only coming from the left speaker, although the right speaker has been on most of the time.

== Franssen effect F2 ==
=== Experiment ===
Inside a room (auditorium) there are two loudspeakers at different positions. At the beginning of the presentation, loudspeaker 1 emits a pure tone with a steep attacking slope. Subsequently the power of this loudspeaker remains constant. The listeners can localize this loudspeaker easily. During the stationary part of the envelope the signal is very smoothly faded over from loudspeaker 1 to loudspeaker 2. Although loudspeaker 2 emits all the sound at the end, the listener's auditory events remain at the position of loudspeaker 1. This mislocalization remains, even if the test supervisor plugs off the cables of loudspeaker 1 demonstratively.

=== Conclusions ===
This effect gives some information about the capabilities of the human auditory system to localize sound sources in enclosed rooms:

- The human auditory system is able to localize a sound source in reverberant sound fields, if there are fast signal changes or signal onsets. (Loudspeaker 1 was correctly localized at the beginning of the experiment.)
- The human auditory system is not able to localize signals with a constant amplitude and spectrum in reverberant sound fields. (The fade over to loudspeaker 2 was not recognized by the listeners.)
- As long as no sound source can be localized, the direction of the last localized sound source remains as the perceived direction. (The auditory event remained at loudspeaker 1, although loudspeaker 2 emitted all the sound at the end of the experiment.)

When looking at the sound, which arrives at the listener's ears, the following situation appears:

- At the beginning of the experiment, when loudspeaker 1 started to emit sound, there was a short time period where only the direct sound of loudspeaker 1 arrived at the listener's ears. In this time period the localization of loudspeaker 1 was surely possible, because it was not yet disturbed by wall reflections.
- Some milliseconds later the sound of the wall reflections arrived and disturbed the localization of sound sources.
- During the fade over the level and the spectrum of the emitted sound remained constant. This fade over was overlaid by many wall reflections from the sound situation before. Obviously no sound source localization was possible during this phase.
- At the end, when only loudspeaker 2 emitted sound, the situation was quite similar, the sound of the wall reflections, which arrived simultaneously, prevented a localization of this sound source.

As a consequence the auditory system seems only to be able to localize sound sources in reverberant environment at sound onsets or at bigger spectral changes. Then the direct sound of the sound source prevails at least in some frequency ranges and the direction of the sound source can be determined. Some milliseconds later, when the sound of the wall reflections arrives, a sound source localization seems no more to be possible. As long as no new localization is possible, the auditory systems seems to keep the last localized direction as perceived sound source direction.

== See also ==
- Binaural fusion
- Haas effect
