= Synthesizer =

Electronic musical instrument

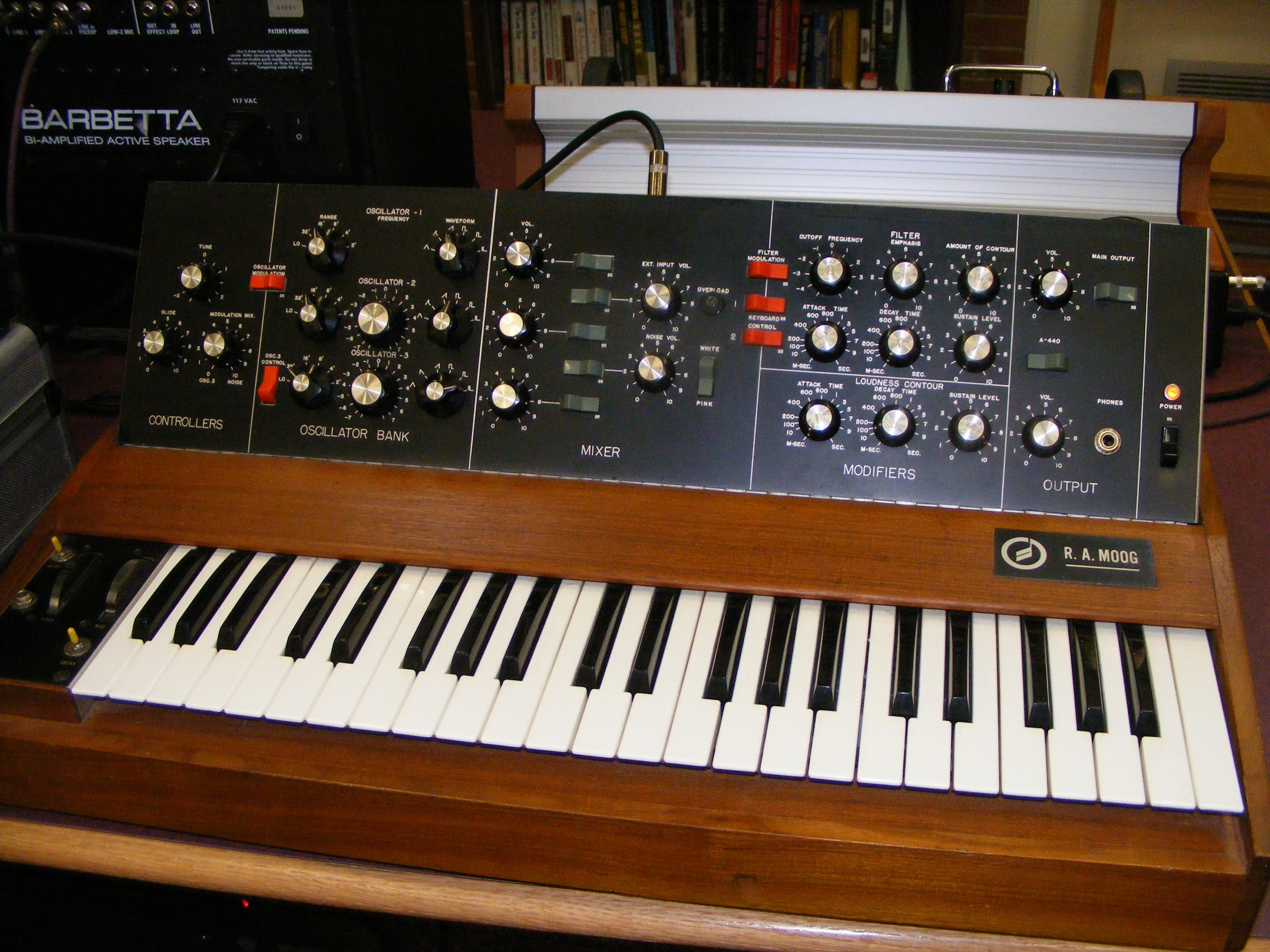
Early Minimoog by R.A. Moog Inc. (c. 1970)

A synthesizer (also synthesiser or synth) is an electronic musical instrument that generates audio signals. Synthesizers typically create sounds by generating waveforms through methods including subtractive synthesis, additive synthesis, and frequency modulation synthesis. These sounds may be altered by components such as filters, which cut or boost frequencies; envelopes, which control articulation, or how notes begin and end; and low-frequency oscillators, which modulate parameters such as pitch, volume, or filter characteristics affecting timbre. Synthesizers are typically played with keyboards or controlled by sequencers, software or other instruments, and can be synchronized to other equipment via MIDI.

Moog + Juno + 303 example
A sample of three synthesizers (Minimoog Model D, Juno 106 and TB-303) playing together

Synthesizer-like instruments emerged in the United States in the mid-20th century with instruments such as the RCA Mark II, which was controlled with punch cards and used hundreds of vacuum tubes. The Moog synthesizer, developed by Robert Moog and first sold in 1964, is credited for pioneering concepts such as voltage-controlled oscillators, envelopes, noise generators, filters, and sequencers. In 1970, the smaller, cheaper Minimoog standardized synthesizers as self-contained instruments with built-in keyboards, unlike the larger modular synthesizers before it.

In 1978, Sequential Circuits released the Prophet-5, which used microprocessors to allow users to store sounds for the first time. MIDI, a standardized means of synchronizing electronic instruments, was introduced in 1982 and remains an industry standard. The Yamaha DX7, released in 1983, was a major success and the first popular digital synthesizer. The Korg M1 synthesizer and workstation, released in 1988, allowed musicians to produce entire tracks without a studio and was the best-selling synthesizer in history as of 2002. Software synthesizers now can be run as plug-ins or embedded on microchips. In the 21st century, analog synthesizers returned to popularity with the advent of cheaper manufacturing.

Synthesizers were initially viewed as avant-garde, valued by the 1960s psychedelic and countercultural scenes but with little perceived commercial potential. Switched-On Bach (1968), a bestselling album of Bach compositions arranged for synthesizer by Wendy Carlos, took synthesizers to the mainstream. They were adopted by electronic acts and pop and rock groups in the 1960s and 1970s and were widely used in 1980s music. Sampling, introduced with the Fairlight synthesizer in 1979, influenced genres such as electronic and hip hop music. The synthesizer is used in nearly every genre and is considered among the most important instruments in the music industry.

== History ==
=== Precursors ===
As electricity became more widely available, the early 20th century saw the invention of electronic musical instruments including the Telharmonium, Trautonium, ondes Martenot and theremin. In the late 1930s, the Hammond Organ Company built the Novachord, a large instrument powered by 72 voltage-controlled amplifiers and 146 vacuum tubes. In 1948, the Canadian engineer Hugh Le Caine completed the electronic sackbut, a precursor to voltage-controlled synthesizers, with keyboard sensitivity allowing for vibrato, glissando, and attack control.

In 1957, Harry Olson and Herbert Belar completed the RCA Mark II Sound Synthesizer at the RCA laboratories in Princeton, New Jersey. The instrument read punched paper tape that controlled an analog synthesizer containing 750 vacuum tubes. It was acquired by the Columbia-Princeton Electronic Music Center and used almost exclusively by Milton Babbitt, a composer at Princeton University.

=== 1960s: Moog and Buchla ===
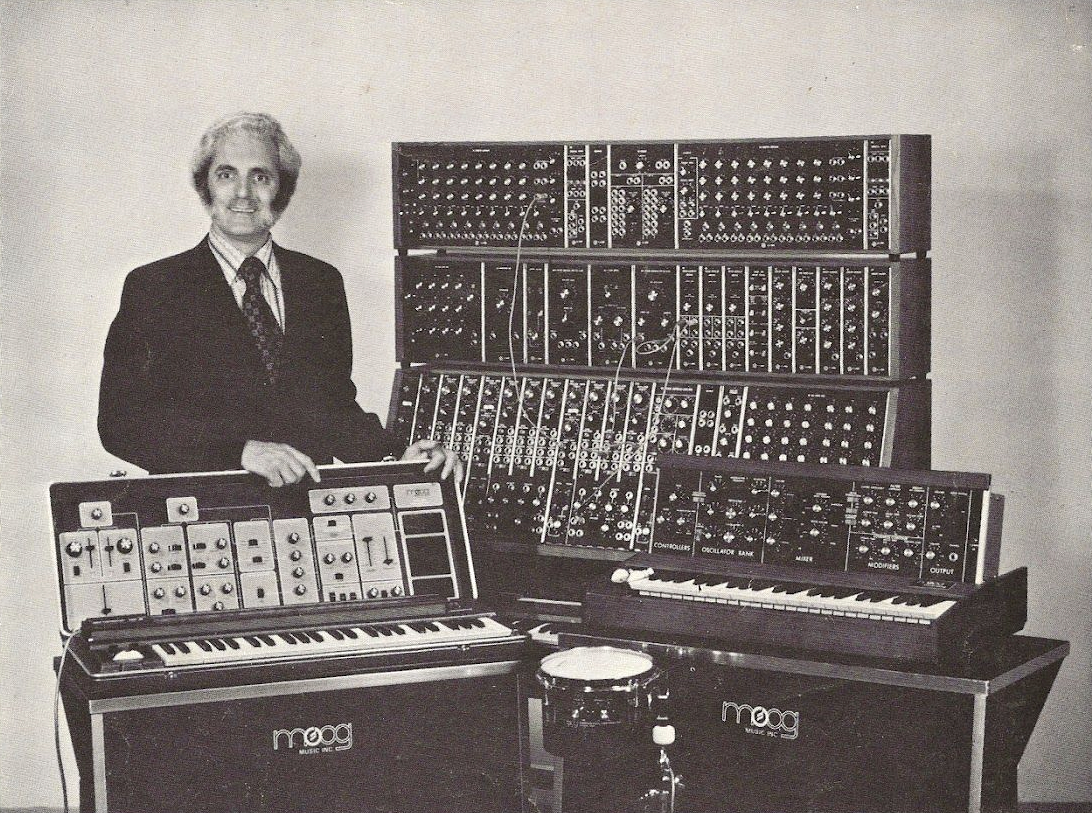
Robert Moog with Moog synthesizers. Many of Moog's inventions, such as voltage-controlled oscillators, became standard in synthesizers.

The authors of Analog Days define "the early years of the synthesizer" as between 1964 and the mid-1970s, beginning with the debut of the Moog synthesizer, designed by the American engineer Robert Moog. The Moog was composed of separate modules connected by patch cables that generate, shape or control sound. Moog developed a means of controlling pitch through voltage, the voltage-controlled oscillator. This became standard, along with Moog components such as envelopes, noise generators, filters, and sequencers.

Around the same period, the American engineer Don Buchla created the Buchla Modular Electronic Music System. Instead of a conventional keyboard, Buchla's system used touchplates that transmitted control voltages depending on finger position and force. However, the Moog's keyboard made it more accessible and marketable to musicians, and keyboards became the standard means of controlling synthesizers. Moog and Buchla initially avoided the word synthesizer for their instruments, as it was associated with the RCA synthesizer; however, by the 1970s, it had become the standard term.

=== 1970s: Portability, polyphony and patch memory ===
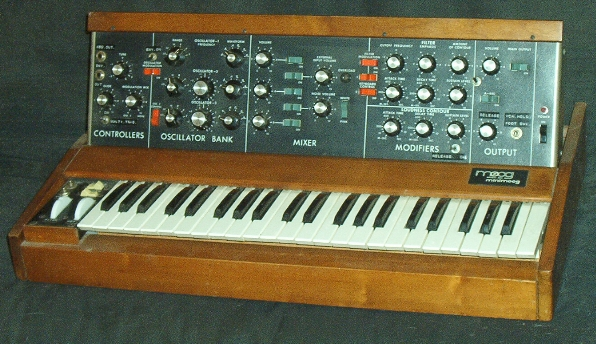
The Minimoog, introduced in 1970, was the first synthesizer sold in music stores.

In 1970, Moog launched a cheaper, smaller synthesizer, the Minimoog. It was the first synthesizer sold in music stores, and was more practical for live performance. It standardized the concept of synthesizers as self-contained instruments with built-in keyboards. In the early 1970s, the British composer Ken Freeman introduced the first string synthesizer, designed to emulate string sections.

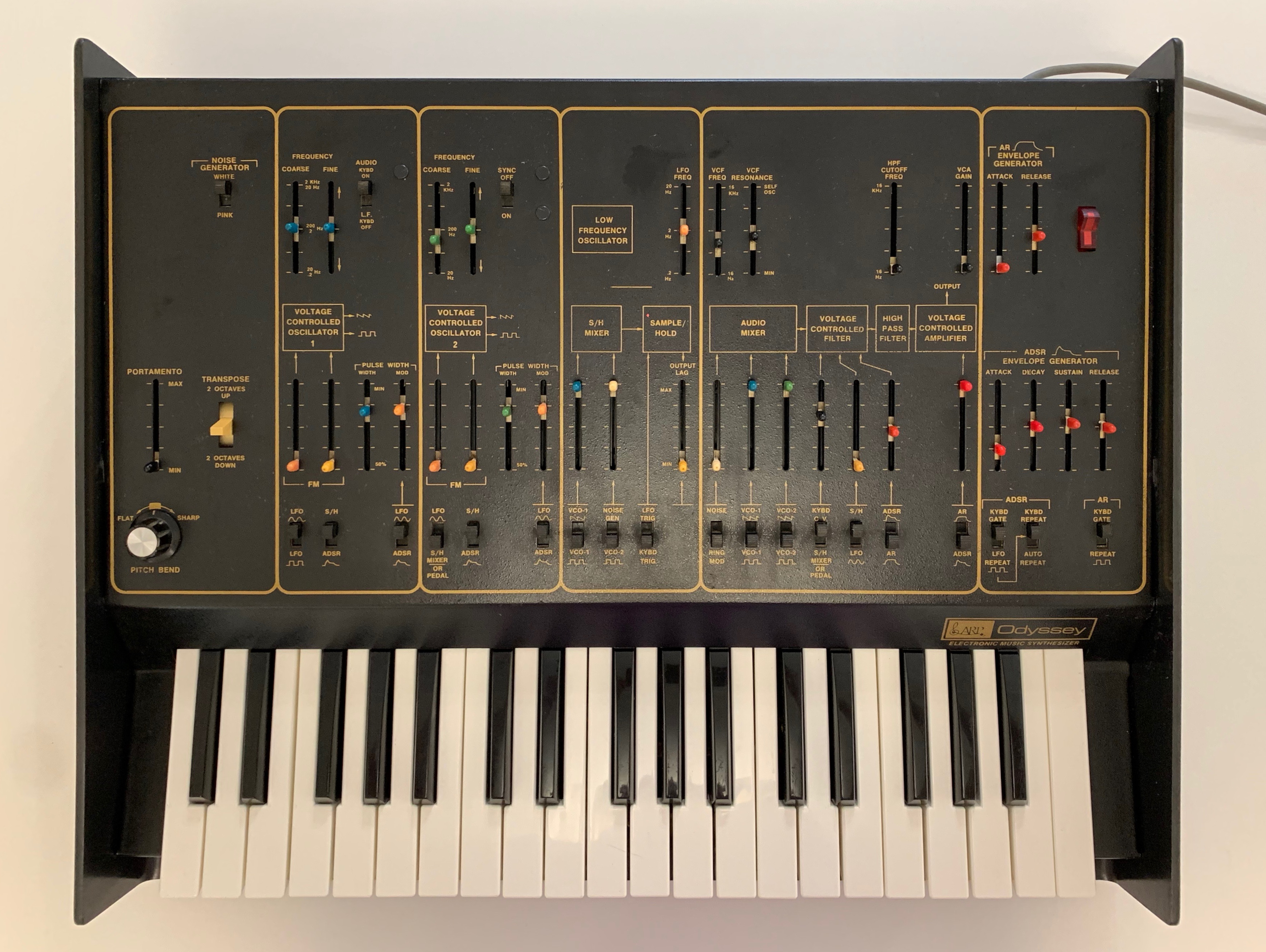
The ARP Odyssey was ARP's highest selling synthesizer.

After retail stores started selling synthesizers in 1971, other synthesizer companies were established, including ARP in the US and EMS in the UK. ARP's products included the ARP 2600, which folded into a carrying case and had built-in speakers, and the Odyssey, a rival to the Minimoog. The less expensive EMS synthesizers were used by European art rock and progressive rock acts including Brian Eno and Pink Floyd. Designs for synthesizers appeared in the amateur electronics market, such as a design published in Practical Electronics in 1973. By the mid-1970s, ARP was the world's largest synthesizer manufacturer, though it closed in 1981.

Early synthesizers were monophonic, meaning they could only play one note at a time. Some of the earliest commercial polyphonic synthesizers were created by the American engineer Tom Oberheim, such as the OB-X (1979). In 1978, the American company Sequential Circuits released the Prophet-5, the first fully programmable polyphonic synthesizer. Whereas previous synthesizers required users to adjust cables and knobs to change sounds, with no guarantee of exactly recreating a sound, the Prophet-5 used microprocessors to store sounds in patch memory. This facilitated a move from synthesizers creating unpredictable sounds to producing "a standard package of familiar sounds".

=== 1980s: Digital technology ===
The synthesizer market grew dramatically in the 1980s. 1982 saw the introduction of MIDI, a standardized means of synchronizing electronic instruments; it remains an industry standard. An influential sampling synthesizer, the Fairlight CMI, was released in 1979, with the ability to record and play back samples at different pitches. Though its high price made it inaccessible to amateurs, it was adopted by high-profile pop musicians including Kate Bush and Peter Gabriel. The success of the Fairlight drove competition, improving sampling technology and lowering prices. Early competing samplers included the E-mu Emulator in 1981 and the Akai S-series in 1985.

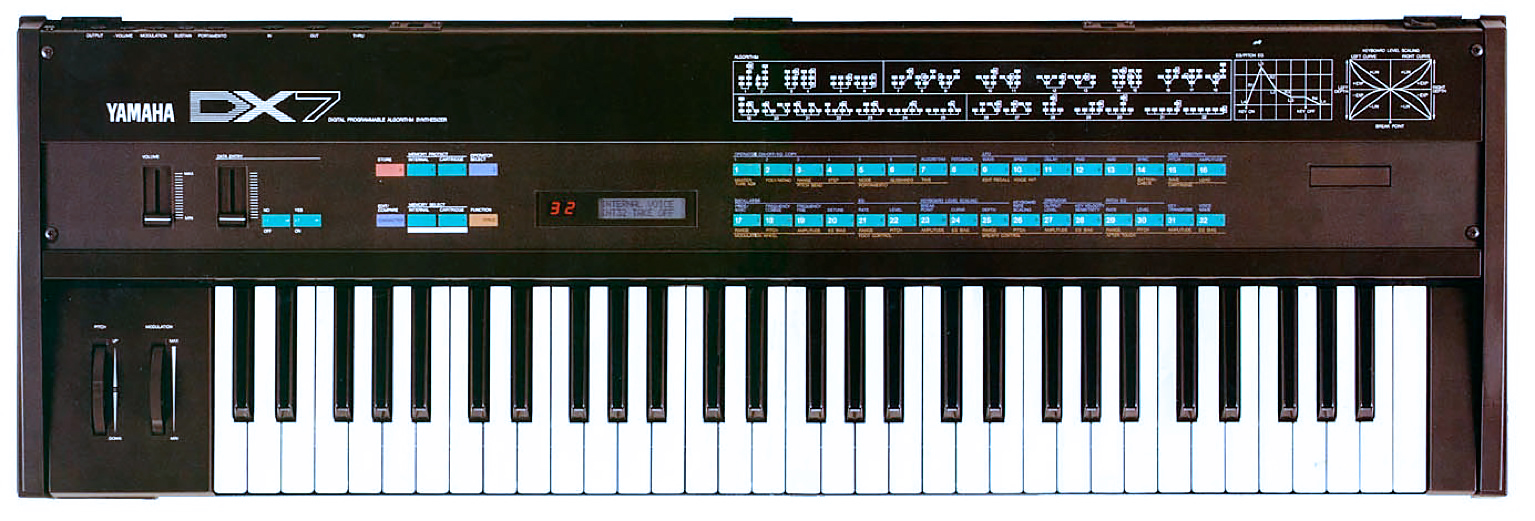
The Yamaha DX7, released in 1983, was the first commercially successful digital synthesizer and was widely used in 1980s pop music.

In 1983, Yamaha released the first commercially successful digital synthesizer, the Yamaha DX7. Based on frequency modulation (FM) synthesis developed by the Stanford University engineer John Chowning, the DX7 was characterized by its "harsh", "glassy" and "chilly" sounds, compared to the "warm" and "fuzzy" sounds of analog synthesis. The DX7 was the first synthesizer to sell more than 100,000 unitsand remains one of the bestselling in history. It was widely used in 1980s pop music.

Digital synthesizers typically contained preset sounds emulating acoustic instruments, with algorithms controlled with menus and buttons. The Synclavier, made with FM technology licensed from Yamaha, offered features such as 16-bit sampling and digital recording. With a starting price of $13,000, its use was limited to universities, studios and wealthy artists. The Roland D-50 (1987) blended Roland's linear arithmetic algorithm with samples, and was the first mass-produced synthesizer with built-in digital effects such as delay, reverb and chorus.

In 1988, the Japanese manufacturer Korg released the M1, a digital synthesizer workstation featuring sampled transients and loops. It allowed musicians to produce entire tracks without a studio before the rise of digital audio workstations. With more than 250,000 units sold, it was the bestselling synthesizer in history as of 2002. The advent of digital synthesizers led to a downturn in interest in analog synthesizers in the following decade.

=== 1990s–present: Software synthesizers and analog revival ===
ReBirth by Propellerhead Software and Reality by Seer Systems, the first software synthesizers that could be played in real time via MIDI, were released in 1997. In 1999, an update to the music software Cubase allowed users to run software instruments (including synthesizers) as plug-ins, triggering a wave of new software instruments. Propellerhead's Reason, released in 2000, introduced an array of recognizable virtual studio equipment.

The market for patchable and modular synthesizers rebounded in the late 1990s. In the 2000s, older analog synthesizers regained popularity, sometimes selling for much more than their original prices. In the 2010s, new, affordable analog synthesizers were introduced by companies including Moog, Korg, Arturia and Dave Smith Instruments. The renewed interest is credited to the appeal of imperfect organic sounds and simpler interfaces, and modern surface-mount technology making analog synthesizers cheaper and faster to manufacture.

== Impact ==
Early synthesizers were viewed as avant-garde, valued by the 1960s psychedelic and counter-cultural scenes for their ability to make new sounds, but with little perceived commercial potential. Switched-On Bach (1968), a bestselling album of Bach compositions arranged for Moog synthesizer by Wendy Carlos, demonstrated that synthesizers could be more than "random noise machines", taking them to the mainstream. However, debates were held about the appropriateness of synthesizers in baroque music, and according to the Guardian they were quickly abandoned in "serious classical circles".

Today, the synthesizer is one of the most important instruments in the music industry, used in nearly every genre. It is considered by the authors of Analog Days as "the only innovation that can stand alongside the electric guitar as a great new instrument of the age of electricity ... Both led to new forms of music, and both had massive popular appeal." According to Fact in 2016, "The synthesizer is as important, and as ubiquitous, in modern music today as the human voice." The musician and producer Brian Eno said that whereas traditional instruments such as pianos come with the expectations of cultural convention and musical history, synthesizers were freeing: "You're designing a new instrument ... It's a constantly unfinished instrument. You finish it when you tweak it, and play around with it, and decide how to use it. You can combine a number of cultural references into one new thing."

=== Rock ===
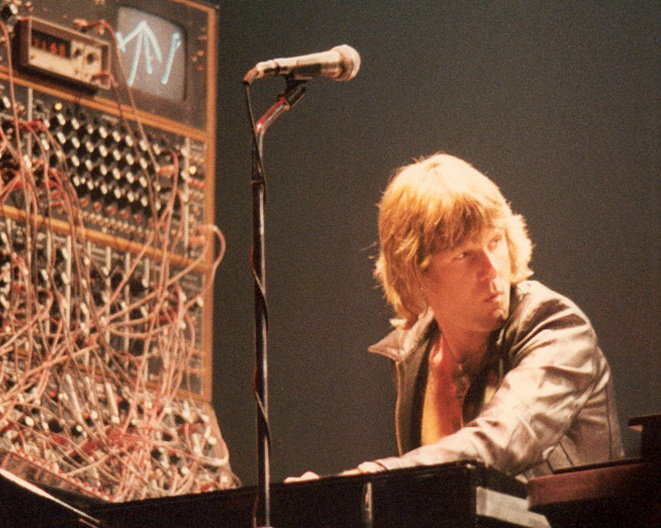
Keyboardist Keith Emerson performing with a Moog synthesizer in 1970

The Moog was adopted by 1960s rock acts including the Doors, the Grateful Dead, the Rolling Stones, the Beatles, and Keith Emerson. Emerson was the first major rock musician to perform with the Moog and it became a trademark of his performances, helping take his band Emerson, Lake & Palmer to global stardom. According to Analog Days, the likes of Emerson, with his Moog performances, "did for the keyboard what Jimi Hendrix did for the guitar". String synthesizers were used by 1970s progressive rock bands including Camel, Caravan, Electric Light Orchestra, Gentle Giant and Renaissance.

The portable Minimoog (1970), much smaller than the modular synthesizers before it, made synthesizers more common in live performance. Early synthesizers could only play one note at a time, making them suitable for basslines, leads and solos. With the rise of polyphonic synthesizers in the 1970s and 1980s, "the keyboard in rock once more started to revert to the background, to be used for fills and atmosphere rather than for soloing". Queen included statements in their 1970s album notes specifying that no synthesisers had been used, but added them in their 1980 album The Game.

=== African-American music ===
The Minimoog took a place in mainstream African-American music, most notably in the work of Stevie Wonder, and in jazz, such as the work of Sun Ra. In the late 1970s and the early 1980s, the Minimoog was widely used in the emerging disco genre by artists including Abba and Giorgio Moroder. Sampling, introduced with the Fairlight synthesizer in 1979, has influenced all genres of music and had a major influence on the development of electronic and hip hop music.

=== Electronic music ===
In the 1970s, electronic music composers such as Jean Michel Jarre and Isao Tomita released successful synthesizer-led instrumental albums. This influenced the emergence of synth-pop from the late 1970s to the early 1980s. The work of German krautrock bands such as Kraftwerk and Tangerine Dream, British acts such as John Foxx, Gary Numan and David Bowie, African-American acts such as George Clinton and Zapp, and Japanese electronic acts such as Yellow Magic Orchestra and Kitaro were influential in the development of the genre.

The sequencer-based Roland TB-303 (1981), in conjunction with the Roland TR-808 and TR-909 drum machines, became a foundation of electronic dance music genres such as house and techno when producers acquired cheap second-hand units later in the decade. The authors of Analog Days connect the synthesizer's origins in 1960s psychedelia to the raves and British Second Summer of Love of the 1980s and the club scenes of the 1990s and 2000s.

=== Pop ===
Gary Numan's 1979 hits "Are 'Friends' Electric?" and "Cars" made heavy use of synthesizers. OMD's "Enola Gay" (1980) used distinctive electronic percussion and a synthesized melody. Soft Cell used a synthesized melody on their 1981 hit "Tainted Love". Nick Rhodes, the keyboardist of Duran Duran, used synthesizers including the Roland Jupiter-4 and Jupiter-8. Chart hits include Depeche Mode's "Just Can't Get Enough" (1981), the Human League's "Don't You Want Me" and works by Ultravox.

In the 1980s, digital synthesizers were widely used in pop music. The Yamaha DX7, released in 1983, became a pop staple, used on songs by A-ha, Kenny Loggins, Kool & the Gang. Its E PIANO 1 preset became particularly famous, especially for power ballads, and was used by artists including Whitney Houston, Chicago, Prince, Phil Collins, Luther Vandross, Billy Ocean and Celine Dion. The Korg M1 was widely used in 1990s pop, such as Madonna's 1990 single "Vogue".

=== Film and television ===
Synthesizers are common in film and television soundtracks. In 1969, Mort Garson used a Moog to compose a soundtrack for the televised footage of the Apollo 11 moonwalk, creating a link between electronic music and space in the American popular imagination. ARP synthesizers were used to create sound effects for the 1977 science fiction films Close Encounters of the Third Kind and Star Wars, including the voice of the robot R2-D2.

In the 1970s and 1980s, synthesizers were used in the scores for thrillers and horror films including A Clockwork Orange (1971), Apocalypse Now (1979), The Fog (1980) and Manhunter (1986). Brad Fiedel used a Prophet synthesizer to record the soundtrack for The Terminator (1984), and the filmmaker John Carpenter used them extensively for his soundtracks. Synthesizers were used to create themes for television shows including Knight Rider (1982), Twin Peaks (1990) and Stranger Things (2016).

=== Jobs ===
When we did a rerecorded version [of "Video Killed the Radio Star"] for Top of the Pops, the Musicians' Union bloke said, "If I think you're making strings sounds out of a synthesiser, I'm going to have you. 'Video Killed the Radio Star' is putting musicians out of business."

— Geoff Downes, keyboardist for synth-pop and new wave band the Buggles

The rise of the synthesizer led to major changes in the music industry, including job displacement, comparable to the 1920s arrival of sound in film, which put live musicians accompanying silent films out of work. With its ability to imitate instruments such as strings and horns, the synthesizer threatened the jobs of session musicians by allowing one keyboardist or music programmer to produce the same range of sounds as an entire orchestra. For a period, the Moog was banned from use in union work, a restriction negotiated by the American Federation of Musicians (AFM). Robert Moog felt that the AFM had not realized that his instrument had to be studied like any other, and instead imagined that "all the sounds that musicians could make somehow existed in the Moog—all you had to do was push a button that said 'Jascha Heifetz' and out would come the most fantastic violin player".

The musician Walter Sear persuaded the AFM that the synthesizer demanded skill, and the category of synthesizer player was accepted into the union. However, players were subject to "suspicion and hostility" for years. In 1982, following a tour by Barry Manilow using synthesizers instead of an orchestra, the British Musicians' Union attempted to ban synthesizers, attracting controversy. In the 1980s, a few musicians skilled at programming the Yamaha DX7 found employment creating sounds for other acts.

== Sound synthesis ==
In subtractive synthesis, complex waveforms are generated by oscillators and then shaped with filters to remove or boost specific frequencies.

Synthesizers generate audio through various forms of analog and digital synthesis.

- In subtractive synthesis, complex waveforms are generated by oscillators and then shaped with filters to remove or boost specific frequencies. Subtractive synthesis is characterized as rich and warm.
- In additive synthesis, a large number of waveforms, usually sine waves, are combined into a composite sound.
- In frequency modulation (FM) synthesis, also known as phase modulation, a carrier wave is modulated with the frequency of a modulator wave; the resulting complex waveform can, in turn, be modulated by another modulator, and this by another, and so on. FM synthesis is characterized as harsh, glassy and chilly.
- Phase distortion synthesis, implemented in Casio CZ synthesizers, is similar to FM synthesis.
- In wavetable synthesis, synthesizers modulate smoothly between digital representations of different waveforms, changing the shape and timbre.
- In sample-based synthesis, instead of sounds being created by synthesizers, samples (digital recordings of sounds) are played back and shaped with components such as filters, envelopes and LFOs.
- In vector synthesis, pioneered by the Prophet VS, users crossfade between different sound sources using controllers such as joysticks, envelopes and LFOs.
- In granular synthesis, an audio sample is split into grains, usually between one hundredth and one tenth of a second in length, which are recombined and played back.
- In physical modelling synthesis, a mathematical model of a physical sound source is created.

== Components ==
=== Oscillators ===
Oscillator wave shape example
Sawtooth wave compared to triangle wave
An example of two identical groups of notes being played first by a sawtooth oscillator, and then by a triangle oscillator.

Oscillators produce waveforms (such as sawtooth, sine, or pulse waves) with different timbres.

=== Voltage-controlled amplifiers ===
Voltage-controlled amplifiers (VCAs) control the volume or gain of the audio signal. VCAs can be modulated by other components, such as LFOs and envelopes. A VCA is a preamp that boosts (amplifies) the electronic signal before passing it on to an external or built-in power amplifier, as well as a means to control its amplitude (volume) using an attenuator. The gain of the VCA is affected by a control voltage (CV), coming from an envelope generator, an LFO, the keyboard or some other source.

=== Envelopes ===
Schematic of ADSR

Envelopes control how sounds change over time. They may control parameters such as amplitude (volume), filters (frequencies), or pitch. The most common envelope is the ADSR (attack, decay, sustain, release) envelope:

- Attack is the time taken for the initial run-up of level from nil to peak, beginning when the note is triggered.
- Decay is the time taken for the subsequent run down from the attack level to the designated sustain level.
- Sustain is the level during the main sequence of the sound's duration, until the key is released.
- Release is the time taken for the level to decay from the sustain level to zero after the key is released.

ADSR envelope example
ADSR envelope with sawtooth wave
An ADSR envelope applied to note amplitude.

=== Low-frequency oscillators ===
Low-frequency oscillators (LFOs) produce waveforms used to modulate parameters, such as the pitch of oscillators (producing vibrato).

=== Filters ===
Filters remove frequencies from the audio signal, similarly to equalization, to shape sounds. They typically include controls to set the point at which frequencies are attenuated, and to add resonance. Common types include low-pass filters, which remove audio above a specified frequency, and high-pass filters, which do the opposite. Filters may be controlled with envelopes or LFOs.

=== Arpeggiators ===
Trance Lead
sound sample of arpeggiator
A sample of Eurodance synthesizer riff with use of rapid 1/16 notes arpeggiator

Arpeggiators take input chords and convert them into arpeggios. They usually include controls for speed, range and mode (the movement of the arpeggio).

=== Controllers ===
Synthesizers are often controlled with electronic or digital keyboards or MIDI controller keyboards, which may be built into the synthesizer unit or attached via connections such as CV/gate, USB, or MIDI. Keyboards may offer expression such as velocity sensitivity and aftertouch, allowing for more control over the sound. Other controllers include ribbon controllers, which track the movement of the finger across a touch-sensitive surface; wind controllers, played similarly to woodwind instruments; motion-sensitive controllers similar to video game motion controllers; electronic drum pads, played similarly to the heads of a drum kit; touchplates, which send signals depending on finger position and force; controllers designed for microtonal tunings; touchscreen devices such as tablets and smartphones; and fingerpads.

== Clones ==
Synthesizer clones are unlicensed recreations of previous synthesizers, often marketed as affordable versions of famous musical equipment. Clones are available as physical instruments and software. Companies that have sold software clones include Arturia and Native Instruments. Behringer manufactures equipment modelled on instruments including the Minimoog, Pro-One, and TB-303, and drum machines such as the TR-808. Other synthesizer clones include the MiniMOD (a series of Eurorack modules based on the Minimoog), the Intellijel Atlantis (based on the SH-101), and the x0x Heart (based on the TB-303).

Creating clones of older hardware is legal where the patents have expired. In 1997, Mackie lost their lawsuit against Behringer as US copyright law did not cover their circuit board designs.

== See also ==
Lists

- List of synthesizers
- List of synthesizer manufacturers

Various synthesizers

- Guitar synthesizer
- Keyboard bass
- Keytar
- Modular synthesizer
- Semi-modular synthesizer
- String synthesizer
- Wind controller

Related instruments & technologies

- 3D sound synthesis
- Clavioline (Musitron)
- Electronic keyboard
- Musical instrument
- Music workstation
- Sampler
- Speech synthesis (Vocaloid)

Components & technologies

- Analytic signal
- Envelope detector
- Low-frequency oscillation
- MIDI

Music genres

- Computer music
- Electronic music

Notable works

- List of compositions for electronic keyboard
