= Ultrasone =

German headphones manufacturer

ULTRASONE AG
- Trade name: ULTRASONE AG
- Company type: Public
- Industry: Audio electronics, Consumer electronics
- Founded: 1991
- Headquarters: Tutzing, Germany
- Area served: global
- Key people: Michael Willberg, CEO; Yvonne Willberg, CFO
- Products: Headphones
- Website: www.ultrasone.com

Ultrasone AG is a German company specializing in headphones for high end studio, DJ, and consumer uses. Ultrasone's headquarters are located in Tutzing, Germany.

== Overview ==
Ultrasone AG was founded as German GmbH in December 1990 by Florian M. König with the stated objective to manufacture advanced headphones with an emphasis on the professional audio sector. A feature of many Ultrasone headphones is a proprietary surround-sound simulacrum technology called S-Logic. The process uses decentralized transducer positioning to spread sound over the outer ear in an attempt to mimic sound heard over speakers.

Since 1999, Ultrasone AG has been producing headphones that they claim reduce the risk of hearing damage, through the use of more efficient transducers and earcups shielded to reduce electromagnetic radiation, designated as LE/ULE (Low/Ultralow Emission). Ultrasone claims that magnetic fields so close to the head could contribute to "listener fatigue" and might be "a potential health hazard". According to Ultrasone, their headphones reduce magnetic emissions by up to 98 percent compared to other headphones.

== See also ==
- Electrical sensitivity
