= Summing localization =

Summing localization occurs when two or more coherent sound waves arrive within a limited time interval and only one sound sensation is perceived. If the time variations are smaller than 1 ms, the time and level variations of all sound sources contribute to the direction of the perceived sound. The resulting auditory event is called a phantom source.

Summing localization is the basis of stereophony.

== See also ==
- Precedence effect
