= Precedence effect =

Psychoacoustical phenomenon

The precedence effect or law of the first wavefront is a binaural psychoacoustical effect concerning sound reflection and the perception of echoes. When two versions of the same sound presented are separated by a sufficiently short time delay (below the listener's echo threshold), listeners perceive a single auditory event; its perceived spatial location is dominated by the location of the first-arriving sound (the first wave front). The lagging sound does also affect the perceived location; however, its effect is mostly suppressed by the first-arriving sound.

The Haas effect was described in 1949 by Helmut Haas in his Ph.D. thesis. The term "Haas effect" is often loosely taken to include the precedence effect which underlies it.

== History ==
Joseph Henry published "On The Limit of Perceptibility of a Direct and Reflected Sound" in 1851.

The "law of the first wavefront" was described and named in 1948 by Lothar Cremer.

The "precedence effect" was described and named in 1949 by Wallach et al. They showed that when two identical sounds are presented in close succession they will be heard as a single fused sound. In their experiments, fusion occurred when the lag between the two sounds was in the range 1 to 5 ms for clicks, and up to 40 ms for more complex sounds such as speech or piano music. When the lag was longer, the second sound was heard as an echo.

Additionally, Wallach et al. demonstrated that when successive sounds coming from sources at different locations were heard as fused, the apparent location of the perceived sound was dominated by the location of the sound that reached the ears first (i.e., the first-arriving wavefront). The second-arriving sound had only a very small (albeit measurable) effect on the perceived location of the fused sound. They designated this phenomenon as the precedence effect, and noted that it explains why sound localization is possible in the typical situation where sounds reverberate from walls, furniture and the like. Sound travels directly from the source to the listener in a straight line, reaching the listener slightly before any reverberations of that sound from furniture and walls. Although those reverberations may be louder in total than the direct sound, the direct sound indicates the source's direction more reliably. They also noted that the precedence effect is an important factor in the perception of stereophonic sound.

Wallach et al. did not systematically vary the intensities of the two sounds, although they cited research by Langmuir et al. which suggested that if the second-arriving sound is at least 15 dB louder than the first, the precedence effect breaks down.

The "Haas effect" derives from a 1951 paper by Helmut Haas. In 1951 Haas examined how the perception of speech is affected in the presence of a single, coherent sound reflection. To create anechoic conditions, the experiment was carried out on the rooftop of a freestanding building. Another test was carried out in a room with a reverberation time of 1.6 s. The test signal (recorded speech) was emitted from two similar loudspeakers at locations 45° to the left and to the right in 3 m distance to the listener.

Haas found that humans localize sound sources in the direction of the first arriving sound despite the presence of a single reflection from a different direction, and that in such cases only a single auditory event is perceived. A reflection arriving later than 1 ms after the direct sound increases the perceived level and spaciousness (more precisely the perceived width of the sound source). A single reflection arriving at a delay of between 5 and 30 ms can be up to 10 dB louder than the direct sound without being perceived as a secondary auditory event (i.e. it does not sound like an echo). This time span varies with the reflection level. If the direct sound is coming from the same direction the listener is facing, the reflection's direction has no significant effect on the results. If the reflection's higher frequencies are attenuated, echo suppression continues to occur even if the delay between the sounds is somewhat longer. Increased room reverberation time also expands the time span available for echo suppression.

== Conditions for occurrence ==
The precedence effect occurs if the subsequent wave fronts arrive between 2 ms and about 50 ms later than the first wave front. This range is signal dependent. For speech, the precedence effect disappears for delays above 50 ms, but for music, the precedence effect can still occur with delays approaching 100 ms.

In two-click lead–lag experiments, localization effects include aspects of summing localization, localization dominance, and lag discrimination suppression. The last two are generally considered to be aspects of the precedence effect:

- Summing localization: for time delays below 2 ms, listeners only perceive one sound; its direction is between the locations of the lead and lag sounds. An application for summing localization is the intensity stereophony, where two loudspeakers emit the same signal with different levels, resulting in the localized sound direction between both loudspeakers. The localized direction depends on the level difference between the loudspeakers.
- Localization dominance: for delays between 2 and 5 ms, listeners also perceive one sound; its location is determined by the location of the leading sound.
- Lag discrimination suppression: for short time delays, listeners are less capable of discriminating the location of the lagging sound.

For time delays above 50 ms (for speech) or some 100 ms (for music) the delayed sound is perceived as an echo of the first-arriving sound, and each sound direction is localized separately and correctly. The time delay for perceiving echoes depends on the signal characteristics. For signals with impulse characteristics, echoes are perceived for delays above 50 ms. For signals with a nearly constant amplitude, the threshold before perceiving an echo can be enhanced up to time differences of 1 to 2 seconds.

A special appearance of the precedence effect is the Haas effect. Haas showed that the precedence effect appears even if the level of the delayed sound is up to 10 dB higher than the level of the first wave front. In this case, the precedence effect only works for delays between 10 and 30 ms.

== Applications ==
The precedence effect is important for hearing in enclosed spaces. With the help of this effect, it remains possible to determine the direction of a sound source (e.g. the direction of a speaker) even in the presence of wall reflections.

=== Sound reinforcement systems ===
Haas's findings can be applied to sound reinforcement systems and public address systems. The signal for loudspeakers placed at distant locations from a stage may be delayed electronically by an amount equal to the time sound takes to travel through the air from the stage to the distant location, plus about 10 to 20 milliseconds, and played at a level up to 10 dB louder than the sound reaching this location directly from the stage. The first arrival of sound from the source on stage determines perceived localization whereas the slightly later sound from delayed loudspeakers simply increases the perceived sound level without negatively affecting localization. In this configuration, the listener will localize all sound from the direction of the direct sound, but they will benefit from the higher sound level, which has been enhanced by the loudspeakers.

=== Ambience extraction ===
The precedence effect can be employed to increase the perception of ambience during the playback of stereo recordings. If two more speakers are placed to the left and right of the listener (in addition to the two main speakers), and are fed with the same program material but delayed by 10 to 20 milliseconds, the random-phase ambience components of the sound will become sufficiently decorrelated that they cannot be localized. This effectively extracts the recording's existing ambience, while leaving its foreground "direct" sounds still appearing to come from the front.

=== Multichannel audio decoding ===
The effect was taken into account and exploited in the psychoacoustics of the Fosgate Tate 101A SQ decoder, developed by Jim Fosgate in consultation with Peter Scheiber and Martin Willcocks, to produce much better spatiality and directionality in matrix decoding of 4-2-4 (SQ quadraphonic) audio.

=== Haas kicker ===
Many older LEDE ("live end, dead end") control room designs featured so-called "Haas kickers" – reflective panels placed at the rear to create specular reflections which were thought to provide a wider stereo listening area or raise intelligibility. However, what is beneficial for one type of sound is detrimental to others, so Haas kickers, like compression ceilings, are no longer commonly found in control rooms.

== See also ==
- Binaural fusion
- Franssen effect
- Summing localization
