= Auditory event =

Auditory events describe the subjective perception, when listening to a certain sound situation. This term was introduced by Jens Blauert (Ruhr-University Bochum) in 1966, in order to distinguish clearly between the physical sound field and the auditory perception of the sound.

Auditory events are the central objects of psychoacoustical investigations. Focus of these investigations is the relationship between the characteristics of a physical sound field and the corresponding perception of listeners. From this relationship conclusions can be drawn about the processing methods of the human auditory system.

Aspects of auditory event investigations can be:

- is there an auditory event?
  Is a certain sound noticeable?
  => Determination of perception thresholds like hearing threshold, auditory masking thresholds etc.
- Which characteristics has the auditory event?
  => Determination of loudness, pitch, sound, harshness etc.
- How is the spatial impression of the auditory event?
  => Determination of sound localization, lateralization, perceived direction etc.
- When can differences in auditory events be noticed?
  How big are the discrimination possibilities of the auditory system?
  => Determination of just noticeable differences

== Relationships between sound field and auditory events ==
The sound field is described by physical quantities, while auditory events are described by quantities of psychoacoustical perception. Below you can find a list with physical sound field quantities and the related psychoacoustical quantities of corresponding auditory events. Mostly there is no simple or proportional relationship between sound field characteristics and auditory events. For example, the auditory event property loudness depends not only on the physical quantity sound pressure but also on the spectral characteristics of the sound and on the sound history.

sound field characteristics	auditory event
sound pressure level	loudness
frequency	pitch
spectrum	timbre
position of a sound source	sound localization
