= Harshness =

Harshness (also called raucousness), in music information retrieval, is a Non-Contextual Low-Level Audio Descriptors (NLDs) that represents one dimension of the multi-dimensional psychoacoustic feature called as musical timbre.

Classical timbre’ NLDs are roughness, spectral centroid, and spectral flux. While harmonicity and inharmonicity can also be considered NLDs, harshness differs from them, as well as from roughness, once it reckons for a distinguished perceptual audio feature expressed by the summary spectral periodicity. This feature is especially clear in single-pitch, single-note, musical audio, where the timbre of two different musical instruments can greatly differ in levels of harshness (e.g., the difference in harshness between a flute and a saxophone is evident). As it is supposed to be, harshness is independent of all others NLDs.
