= Head shadow =

A head shadow (or acoustic shadow) is a region of reduced amplitude of a sound because it is obstructed by the head. It is an example of diffraction.

Sound may have to travel through and around the head in order to reach an ear. The obstruction caused by the head can account for attenuation (reduced amplitude) of overall intensity as well as cause a filtering effect. The filtering effects of head shadowing are an essential element of sound localisation—the brain weighs the relative amplitude, timbre, and phase of a sound heard by the two ears and uses the difference to interpret directional information.

The shadowed ear, the ear further from the sound source, receives sound slightly later (up to approximately 0.7 ms later) than the unshadowed ear, and the timbre, or frequency spectrum, of the shadowed sound wave is different because of the obstruction of the head.

The head shadow causes particular difficulty in sound localisation in people suffering from unilateral hearing loss. It is a factor to consider when correcting hearing loss with directional hearing aids.

== See also ==
- Interaural intensity difference
- Hearing

== Sources ==
- Gray, Lincoln; Kesser, Bradley; Cole, Erika (September 2009). "Understanding speech in noise after correction of congenital unilateral aural atresia: effects of age in the emergence of binaural squelch but not in use of head-shadow". Int. J. Pediatr. Otorhinolaryngol. 73 (9): 1281–7. doi:10.1016/j.ijporl.2009.05.024. PMID 19581007.
- Oberzut, Cherish; Olson, Laurel (2003). "Directionality and the head-shadow effect". The Hearing Journal. 56 (4): 56. doi:10.1097/01.HJ.0000293911.35305.25. S2CID 61398142.
- Schleich, P.; Nopp, P.; d'Haese, P. (June 2004). "Head shadow, squelch, and summation effects in bilateral users of the MED-EL COMBI 40/40+ cochlear implant". Ear Hear. 25 (3): 197–204. doi:10.1097/01.aud.0000130792.43315.97. PMID 15179111. S2CID 26115988.
- Van Wanrooij, M. M.; Van Opstal, A. J. (April 2004). "Contribution of head shadow and pinna cues to chronic monaural sound localization". J. Neurosci. 24 (17): 4163–71. doi:10.1523/JNEUROSCI.0048-04.2004. PMC 6729291. PMID 15115811.
