= For Ann (rising) =

1969 composition by James Tenney

For Ann (rising) is a piece of electronic music composed by American composer and music theorist James Tenney in 1969. The piece incorporates the Shepard tone concept, named after Tenney's colleague at Bell Labs, psychologist Roger Shepard. The technique which the piece uses is more properly described as a continuous Risset scale, or a Shepard-Risset glissando (Polansky 2003).

It consists of a repeating sequence of sine waves arranged in a glissando between twelve and fifteen rising at any time and fading in and out, entering a minor sixth below their predecessors (Polansky 2003; Wannamaker 2021). The concept of the piece derived from Tenney's speculations on auditory illusions in his 1961 master's thesis Meta (+) Hodos, an early application of gestalt theory and cognitive science to music.

== Variations ==
Imagining an inverted version of For Ann (rising), American composer Philip Corner once remarked that the piece "must be optimistic! (Imagine the depressing effectiveness of it—he could never be so cruel—downward)..." (Grimshaw n.d.).

Tenney suggested in later years that the piece could be "regenerated" with the distance between successive voices, the minor sixth (1.6 in just intonation, 1.587 in equal temperament), being tuned to golden ratio phi (1.618). He noted that this would aurally achieve a more illusory effect, because then all first-order difference tones between adjacent voices would be present in lower voices (Polansky 2003).

== See also ==
- Pitch circularity

== Sources ==
- Grimshaw, Jeremy. n.d. "James Tenney: For Ann (Rising): Description". Allmusic.com (accessed 27 September 2014).
- Polansky, Larry. 2003. Liner notes to James Tenney: Selected Works 1961–1969. Regenerated by Tom Erbe using Barry Vercoe's Csound according to Tenney's specifications. New World Records 805702.
- Erbe, Tom. 2011. "Some notes on For Ann (rising)".
- Wannamaker, Robert. 2021. "The Music of James Tenney, Volume 1: Contexts and Paradigms. University of Illinois Press.
