= Pitch circularity =

Fixed series of tones that appear to ascend or descend endlessly in pitch

Penrose stairs, visual metaphor for pitch circularity

Pitch circularity is a fixed series of tones that are perceived to ascend or descend endlessly in pitch. It is an example of an auditory illusion.

== Explanation ==
Pitch is often defined as extending along a one-dimensional continuum from high to low, as can be experienced by sweeping one’s hand up or down a piano keyboard. This continuum is known as pitch height. However pitch also varies in a circular fashion, known as pitch class: as one plays up a keyboard in semitone steps, C, C♯, D, D♯, E, F, F♯, G, G♯, A, A♯ and B sound in succession, followed by C again, but one octave higher. Because the octave is the most consonant interval after the unison, tones that stand in octave relation, and are so of the same pitch class, have a certain perceptual equivalence—all Cs sound more alike to other Cs than to any other pitch class, as do all D♯s, and so on; this creates the auditory equivalent of a Barber's pole, where all tones of the same pitch class are located on the same side of the pole, but at different heights.

== Research on pitch perception ==
Researchers have demonstrated that by creating banks of tones whose note names are clearly defined perceptually but whose perceived heights are ambiguous, one can create scales that appear to ascend or descend endlessly in pitch. Roger Shepard achieved this ambiguity of height by creating banks of complex tones, with each tone composed only of components that stood in octave relationship. In other words, the components of the complex tone C consisted only of Cs, but in different octaves, and the components of the complex tone F♯ consisted only of F♯s, but in different octaves. When such complex tones are played in semitone steps the listener perceives a scale that appears to ascend endlessly in pitch. Jean-Claude Risset achieved the same effect using gliding tones instead, so that a single tone appeared to glide up or down endlessly in pitch. Circularity effects based on this principle have been produced in orchestral music and electronic music, by having multiple instruments playing simultaneously in different octaves.

Normann et al. showed that pitch circularity can be created using a bank of single tones; here the relative amplitudes of the odd and even harmonics of each tone are manipulated so as to create ambiguities of height. A different algorithm that creates ambiguities of pitch height by manipulating the relative amplitudes of the odd and even harmonics, was developed by Diana Deutsch and colleagues. Using this algorithm, gliding tones that appear to ascend or descend endlessly are also produced. This development has led to the intriguing possibility that, using this new algorithm, one might transform banks of natural instrument samples so as to produce tones that sound like those of natural instruments but still have the property of circularity. This development opens up new avenues for music composition and performance.

== See also ==
- Chromatic circle
- Shepard tone
- Tritone paradox
