= Glissando illusion =

Auditory illusion

The glissando illusion is an auditory illusion, created when a sound with a fixed pitch, such as a synthesized oboe tone, is played together with a sine wave gliding up and down in pitch, and they are both switched back and forth between stereo loudspeakers. The effect is that the oboe is heard as switching between loudspeakers while the sine wave is heard as joined together seamlessly, and as moving around in space in accordance with its pitch motion. Right-handers often hear the glissando as traveling from left to right as its pitch glides from low to high, and then back from right to left as its pitch glides from high to low.

The effect was first reported and demonstrated by Diana Deutsch in Musical Illusions and Paradoxes, 1995.

== See also ==
Shepard–Risset glissando: A different glissando-related musical illusion
