= Neuroscience of music =

Scientific study of brain processes related to music

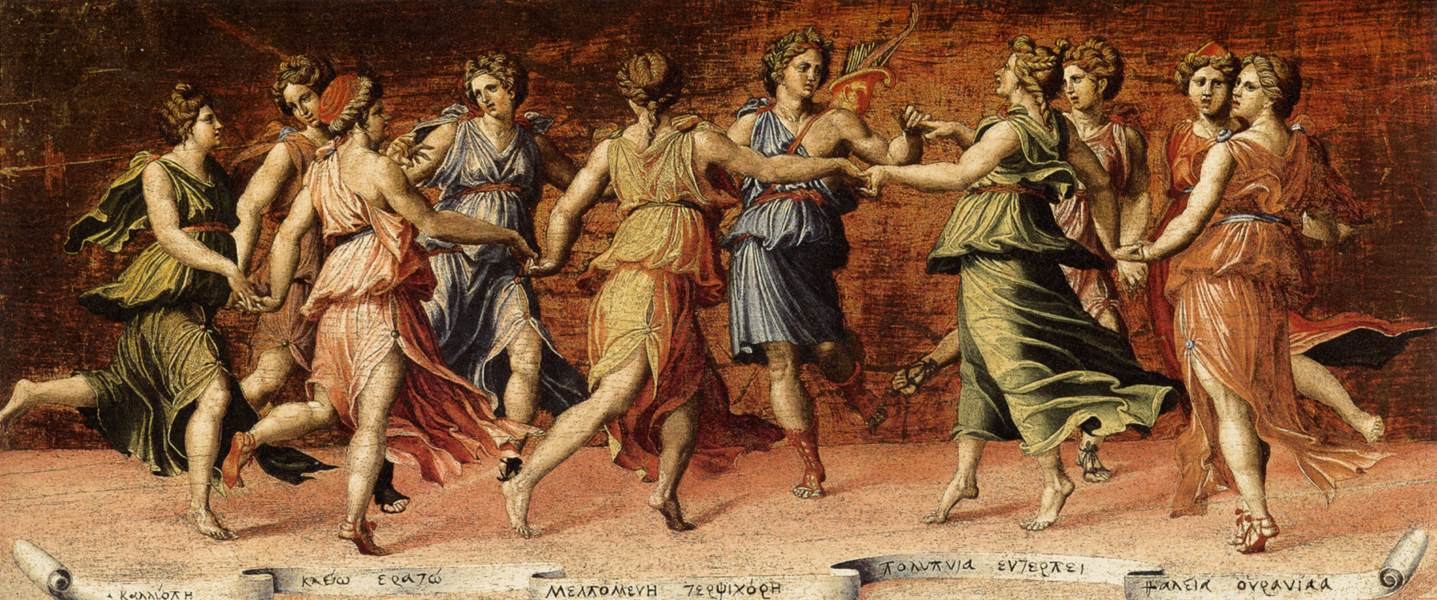
Apollo and the Muses, Baldassarre Peruzzi (1514–1523).

The neuroscience of music is the scientific study of brain-based mechanisms involved in the cognitive processes underlying music. These behaviours include music listening, perceiving, performing, composing, reading, writing, and other related activities. It also is increasingly concerned with the brain basis for musical aesthetics and musical emotion. Scientists working in this field may have training in cognitive neuroscience, neurology, neuroanatomy, psychology, music theory, computer science, and other relevant fields.

The cognitive neuroscience of music represents a significant branch of music psychology, and is distinguished from related fields such as cognitive musicology in its reliance on direct observations of the brain and use of brain imaging techniques like functional magnetic resonance imaging (fMRI) and positron emission tomography (PET).

== Elements of music ==
=== Pitch ===
Sounds consist of waves of air molecules that vibrate at different frequencies. These waves travel to the basilar membrane in the cochlea of the inner ear. Different frequencies of sound will cause vibrations in different locations of the basilar membrane. We are able to hear different pitches because each sound wave with a unique frequency is correlated to a different location along the basilar membrane. This spatial arrangement of sounds and their respective frequencies being processed in the basilar membrane is known as tonotopy. When the hair cells on the basilar membrane move back and forth due to the vibrating sound waves, they release neurotransmitters and cause action potentials to occur down the auditory nerve. The auditory nerve then leads to several layers of synapses at numerous clusters of neurons, or nuclei, in the auditory brainstem. These nuclei are also tonotopically organized, and the process of achieving this tonotopy after the cochlea is not yet well understood. This tonotopy is in general maintained up to primary auditory cortex in mammals.

A widely postulated mechanism for pitch processing in the early central auditory system is the phase-locking and mode-locking of action potentials to frequencies in a stimulus. Phase-locking to stimulus frequencies has been shown in the auditory nerve, the cochlear nucleus, the inferior colliculus, and the auditory thalamus. By phase- and mode-locking in this way, the auditory brainstem is known to preserve a good deal of the temporal and low-passed frequency information from the original sound; this is evident by measuring the auditory brainstem response using electroencephalography (EEG). This temporal preservation is one way to argue directly for the temporal theory of pitch perception, and to argue indirectly against the place theory of pitch perception.

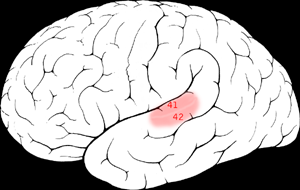
The primary auditory cortex is one of the main areas associated with superior pitch resolution.

The right secondary auditory cortex has finer pitch resolution than the left. Hyde, Peretz and Zatorre (2008) used functional magnetic resonance imaging (fMRI) in their study to test the involvement of right and left auditory cortical regions in the frequency processing of melodic sequences. As well as finding superior pitch resolution in the right secondary auditory cortex, specific areas found to be involved were the planum temporale (PT) in the secondary auditory cortex, and the primary auditory cortex in the medial section of Heschl's gyrus (HG).

Many neuroimaging studies have found evidence of the importance of right secondary auditory regions in aspects of musical pitch processing, such as melody. Many of these studies such as one by Patterson, Uppenkamp, Johnsrude and Griffiths (2002) also find evidence of a hierarchy of pitch processing. Patterson et al. (2002) used spectrally matched sounds which produced: no pitch, fixed pitch or melody in an fMRI study and found that all conditions activated HG and PT. Sounds with pitch activated more of these regions than sounds without. When a melody was produced activation spread to the superior temporal gyrus (STG) and planum polare (PP). These results support the existence of a pitch processing hierarchy.

==== Absolute pitch ====
Musicians possessing perfect pitch can identify the pitch of musical tones without external reference.

Absolute pitch (AP) is defined as the ability to identify the pitch of a musical tone or to produce a musical tone at a given pitch without the use of an external reference pitch. Neuroscientific research has not discovered a distinct activation pattern common for possessors of AP. Zatorre, Perry, Beckett, Westbury and Evans (1998) examined the neural foundations of AP using functional and structural brain imaging techniques. Positron emission tomography (PET) was utilized to measure cerebral blood flow (CBF) in musicians possessing AP and musicians lacking AP. When presented with musical tones, similar patterns of increased CBF in auditory cortical areas emerged in both groups. AP possessors and non-AP subjects demonstrated similar patterns of left dorsolateral frontal activity when they performed relative pitch judgments. However, in non-AP subjects activation in the right inferior frontal cortex was present whereas AP possessors showed no such activity. This finding suggests that musicians with AP do not need access to working memory devices for such tasks. These findings imply that there is no specific regional activation pattern unique to AP. Rather, the availability of specific processing mechanisms and task demands determine the recruited neural areas.

=== Melody ===
Studies suggest that individuals are capable of automatically detecting a difference or anomaly in a melody such as an out of tune pitch which does not fit with their previous music experience. This automatic processing occurs in the secondary auditory cortex. Brattico, Tervaniemi, Naatanen, and Peretz (2006) performed one such study to determine if the detection of tones that do not fit an individual's expectations can occur automatically. They recorded event-related potentials (ERPs) in nonmusicians as they were presented unfamiliar melodies with either an out of tune pitch or an out of key pitch while participants were either distracted from the sounds or attending to the melody. Both conditions revealed an early frontal error-related negativity independent of where attention was directed. This negativity originated in the auditory cortex, more precisely in the supratemporal lobe (which corresponds with the secondary auditory cortex) with greater activity from the right hemisphere. The negativity response was larger for pitch that was out of tune than that which was out of key. Ratings of musical incongruity were higher for out of tune pitch melodies than for out of key pitch. In the focused attention condition, out of key and out of tune pitches produced late parietal positivity. The findings of Brattico et al. (2006) suggest that there is automatic and rapid processing of melodic properties in the secondary auditory cortex. The findings that pitch incongruities were detected automatically, even in processing unfamiliar melodies, suggests that there is an automatic comparison of incoming information with long term knowledge of musical scale properties, such as culturally influenced rules of musical properties (common chord progressions, scale patterns, etc.) and individual expectations of how the melody should proceed.

=== Rhythm ===
The belt and parabelt areas of the right hemisphere are involved in processing rhythm. Rhythm is a strong repeated pattern of movement or sound. When individuals are preparing to tap out a rhythm of regular intervals (1:2 or 1:3) the left frontal cortex, left parietal cortex, and right cerebellum are all activated. With more difficult rhythms such as a 1:2.5, more areas in the cerebral cortex and cerebellum are involved. EEG recordings have also shown a relationship between brain electrical activity and rhythm perception. Snyder and Large (2005) performed a study examining rhythm perception in human subjects, finding that activity in the gamma band (20 – 60 Hz) corresponds to the beats in a simple rhythm. Two types of gamma activity were found by Snyder & Large: induced gamma activity, and evoked gamma activity. Evoked gamma activity was found after the onset of each tone in the rhythm; this activity was found to be phase-locked (peaks and troughs were directly related to the exact onset of the tone) and did not appear when a gap (missed beat) was present in the rhythm. Induced gamma activity, which was not found to be phase-locked, was also found to correspond with each beat. However, induced gamma activity did not subside when a gap was present in the rhythm, indicating that induced gamma activity may possibly serve as a sort of internal metronome independent of auditory input.

=== Tonality ===
Tonality describes the relationships between the elements of melody and harmony – tones, intervals, chords, and scales. These relationships are often characterized as hierarchical, such that one of the elements dominates or attracts another. They occur both within and between every type of element, creating a rich and time-varying perception between tones and their melodic, harmonic, and chromatic contexts. In one conventional sense, tonality refers to just the major and minor scale types – examples of scales whose elements are capable of maintaining a consistent set of functional relationships. The most important functional relationship is that of the tonic note (the first note in a scale) and the tonic chord (the first note in the scale with the third and fifth note) with the rest of the scale. The tonic is the element which tends to assert its dominance and attraction over all others, and it functions as the ultimate point of attraction, rest and resolution for the scale.

The right auditory cortex is primarily involved in perceiving pitch, and parts of harmony, melody and rhythm. One study by Petr Janata found that there are tonality-sensitive areas in the medial prefrontal cortex, the cerebellum, the superior temporal sulci of both hemispheres and the superior temporal gyri (which has a skew towards the right hemisphere). Hemispheric asymmetries in the processing of dissonant/consonant sounds have been demonstrated. ERP studies have shown larger evoked responses over the left temporal area in response to dissonant chords, and over the right one, in response to consonant chords.

== Music production and performance ==
=== Motor control functions ===
Musical performance usually involves at least three elementary motor control functions: timing, sequencing, and spatial organization of motor movements. Accuracy in timing of movements is related to musical rhythm. Rhythm, the pattern of temporal intervals within a musical measure or phrase, in turn creates the perception of stronger and weaker beats. Sequencing and spatial organization relate to the expression of individual notes on a musical instrument.

These functions and their neural mechanisms have been investigated separately in many studies, but little is known about their combined interaction in producing a complex musical performance. The study of music requires examining them together.

==== Timing ====
Although neural mechanisms involved in timing movement have been studied rigorously over the past 20 years, much remains controversial. The ability to phrase movements in precise time has been accredited to a neural metronome or clock mechanism where time is represented through oscillations or pulses. An opposing view to this metronome mechanism has also been hypothesized stating that it is an emergent property of the kinematics of movement itself. Kinematics is defined as parameters of movement through space without reference to forces (for example, direction, velocity and acceleration).

Functional neuroimaging studies, as well as studies of brain-damaged patients, have linked movement timing to several cortical and sub-cortical regions, including the cerebellum, basal ganglia and supplementary motor area (SMA). Specifically the basal ganglia and possibly the SMA have been implicated in interval timing at longer timescales (1 second and above), while the cerebellum may be more important for controlling motor timing at shorter timescales (milliseconds). Furthermore, these results indicate that motor timing is not controlled by a single brain region, but by a network of regions that control specific parameters of movement and that depend on the relevant timescale of the rhythmic sequence.

==== Sequencing ====
Motor sequencing has been explored in terms of either the ordering of individual movements, such as finger sequences for key presses, or the coordination of subcomponents of complex multi-joint movements. Implicated in this process are various cortical and sub-cortical regions, including the basal ganglia, the SMA and the pre-SMA, the cerebellum, and the premotor and prefrontal cortices, all involved in the production and learning of motor sequences but without explicit evidence of their specific contributions or interactions amongst one another. In animals, neurophysiological studies have demonstrated an interaction between the frontal cortex and the basal ganglia during the learning of movement sequences. Human neuroimaging studies have also emphasized the contribution of the basal ganglia for well-learned sequences.

The cerebellum is arguably important for sequence learning and for the integration of individual movements into unified sequences, while the pre-SMA and SMA have been shown to be involved in organizing or chunking of more complex movement sequences. Chunking, defined as the re-organization or re-grouping of movement sequences into smaller sub-sequences during performance, is thought to facilitate the smooth performance of complex movements and to improve motor memory. Lastly, the premotor cortex has been shown to be involved in tasks that require the production of relatively complex sequences, and it may contribute to motor prediction.

==== Spatial organization ====
Few studies of complex motor control have distinguished between sequential and spatial organization, yet expert musical performances demand not only precise sequencing but also spatial organization of movements. Studies in animals and humans have established the involvement of parietal, sensory–motor and premotor cortices in the control of movements, when the integration of spatial, sensory and motor information is required. Few studies so far have explicitly examined the role of spatial processing in the context of musical tasks.

=== Auditory-motor interactions ===
==== Feedforward and feedback interactions ====
An auditory–motor interaction may be loosely defined as any engagement of or communication between the two systems. Two classes of auditory-motor interaction are "feedforward" and "feedback". In feedforward interactions, it is the auditory system that predominately influences the motor output, often in a predictive way. An example is the phenomenon of tapping to the beat, where the listener anticipates the rhythmic accents in a piece of music. Another example is the effect of music on movement disorders: rhythmic auditory stimuli have been shown to improve walking ability in Parkinson's disease and stroke patients.

Feedback interactions are particularly relevant in playing an instrument such as a violin, or in singing, where pitch is variable and must be continuously controlled. If auditory feedback is blocked, musicians can still execute well-rehearsed pieces, but expressive aspects of performance are affected. When auditory feedback is experimentally manipulated by delays or distortions, motor performance is significantly altered: asynchronous feedback disrupts the timing of events, whereas alteration of pitch information disrupts the selection of appropriate actions, but not their timing. This suggests that disruptions occur because both actions and percepts depend on a single underlying mental representation.

==== Models of auditory–motor interactions ====
Several models of auditory–motor interactions have been advanced. The model of Hickok and Poeppel, which is specific for speech processing, proposes that a ventral auditory stream maps sounds onto meaning, whereas a dorsal stream maps sounds onto articulatory representations. They and others suggest that posterior auditory regions at the parieto-temporal boundary are crucial parts of the auditory–motor interface, mapping auditory representations onto motor representations of speech, and onto melodies.

==== Mirror/echo neurons and auditory–motor interactions ====
The mirror neuron system has an important role in neural models of sensory–motor integration. There is considerable evidence that neurons respond to both actions and the accumulated observation of actions. A system proposed to explain this understanding of actions is that visual representations of actions are mapped onto our own motor system.

Some mirror neurons are activated both by the observation of goal-directed actions, and by the associated sounds produced during the action. This suggests that the auditory modality can access the motor system. While these auditory–motor interactions have mainly been studied for speech processes, and have focused on Broca's area and the vPMC, as of 2011, experiments have begun to shed light on how these interactions are needed for musical performance. Results point to a broader involvement of the dPMC and other motor areas. The literature has shown a highly specialized cortical network in the skilled musician's brain that codes the relationship between musical gestures and their corresponding sounds. The data hint at the existence of an audiomotor mirror network involving the right superior temporal gyrus, the premotor cortex, the inferior frontal and inferior parietal areas, among other areas.

== Music and language ==
Certain aspects of language and melody have been shown to be processed in near identical functional brain areas. Brown, Martinez and Parsons (2006) examined the neurological structural similarities between music and language. Using positron emission tomography (PET), the findings showed that both linguistic and melodic phrases produced activation in almost identical functional brain areas: primary motor cortex, supplementary motor area, Broca's area, anterior insula, primary and secondary auditory cortices, temporal pole, basal ganglia, ventral thalamus and posterior cerebellum. Differences were found in lateralization tendencies as language tasks favoured the left hemisphere, but the majority of activations were bilateral which produced significant overlap across modalities.

Syntactical information mechanisms in both music and language have been shown to be processed similarly in the brain. Jentschke, Koelsch, Sallat and Friederici (2008) conducted a study investigating the processing of music in children with specific language impairments (SLIs). Children with typical language development showed event-related potential (ERP) patterns different from those of children with SLI, which reflected their challenges in processing music-syntactic regularities. Strong correlations between the ERAN (Early Right Anterior Negativity—a specific ERP measure) amplitude and linguistic and musical abilities provide additional evidence for the relationship of syntactical processing in music and language.

However, production of melody and production of speech may be subserved by different neural networks. Stewart, Walsh, Frith and Rothwell (2001) studied the differences between speech production and song production using transcranial magnetic stimulation (TMS). Stewart et al. found that TMS applied to the left frontal lobe disturbs speech but not melody supporting the idea that they are subserved by different areas of the brain. The authors suggest that a reason for the difference is that speech generation can be localized well but the underlying mechanisms of melodic production cannot. Alternatively, it was also suggested that speech production may be less robust than melodic production and thus more susceptible to interference.

Language processing is a function more of the left side of the brain than the right side, particularly Broca's area and Wernicke's area, though the roles played by the two sides of the brain in processing different aspects of language are still unclear. Music is also processed by both the left and the right sides of the brain. Recent evidence further suggest shared processing between language and music at the conceptual level. It has also been found that, among music conservatory students, the prevalence of absolute pitch is much higher for speakers of tonal languages, even controlling for ethnic background, showing that language influences how musical tones are perceived.

== Musician vs. non-musician processing ==
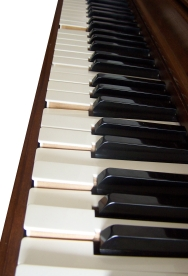
Professional pianists show less cortical activation for complex finger movement tasks due to structural differences in the brain.

=== Differences ===
Brain structure within musicians and non-musicians is distinctly different. Gaser and Schlaug (2003) compared brain structures of professional musicians with non-musicians and discovered gray matter volume differences in motor, auditory and visual-spatial brain regions. Specifically, positive correlations were discovered between musician status (professional, amateur and non-musician) and gray matter volume in the primary motor and somatosensory areas, premotor areas, anterior superior parietal areas and in the inferior temporal gyrus bilaterally. This strong association between musician status and gray matter differences supports the notion that musicians' brains show use-dependent structural changes. Due to the distinct differences in several brain regions, it is unlikely that these differences are innate but rather due to the long-term acquisition and repetitive rehearsal of musical skills.

Brains of musicians also show functional differences from those of non-musicians. Krings, Topper, Foltys, Erberich, Sparing, Willmes and Thron (2000) utilized fMRI to study brain area involvement of professional pianists and a control group while performing complex finger movements. Krings et al. found that the professional piano players showed lower levels of cortical activation in motor areas of the brain. It was concluded that a lesser amount of neurons needed to be activated for the piano players due to long-term motor practice which results in the different cortical activation patterns. Koeneke, Lutz, Wustenberg and Jancke (2004) reported similar findings in keyboard players. Skilled keyboard players and a control group performed complex tasks involving unimanual and bimanual finger movements. During task conditions, strong hemodynamic responses in the cerebellum were shown by both non-musicians and keyboard players, but non-musicians showed the stronger response. This finding indicates that different cortical activation patterns emerge from long-term motor practice. This evidence supports previous data showing that musicians require fewer neurons to perform the same movements.

Musicians have been shown to have significantly more developed left planum temporales, and have also shown to have a greater word memory. Chan's study controlled for age, grade point average and years of education and found that when given a 16-word memory test, the musicians averaged one to two more words above their non-musical counterparts.

=== Similarities ===
Studies have shown that the human brain has an implicit musical ability. Koelsch, Gunter, Friederici and Schoger (2000) investigated the influence of preceding musical context, task relevance of unexpected chords and the degree of probability of violation on music processing in both musicians and non-musicians. Findings showed that the human brain unintentionally extrapolates expectations about impending auditory input. Even in non-musicians, the extrapolated expectations are consistent with music theory. The ability to process information musically supports the idea of an implicit musical ability in the human brain. In a follow-up study, Koelsch, Schroger, and Gunter (2002) investigated whether ERAN and N5 could be evoked preattentively in non-musicians. Findings showed that both ERAN and N5 can be elicited even in a situation where the musical stimulus is ignored by the listener indicating that there is a highly differentiated preattentive musicality in the human brain.

== Gender differences ==
Minor neurological differences regarding hemispheric processing exist between brains of males and females. Koelsch, Maess, Grossmann and Friederici (2003) investigated music processing through EEG and ERPs and discovered gender differences. Findings showed that females process music information bilaterally and males process music with a right-hemispheric predominance. However, the early negativity of males was also present over the left hemisphere. This indicates that males do not exclusively utilize the right hemisphere for musical information processing. In a follow-up study, Koelsch, Grossman, Gunter, Hahne, Schroger and Friederici (2003) found that boys show lateralization of the early anterior negativity in the left hemisphere but found a bilateral effect in girls. This indicates a developmental effect as early negativity is lateralized in the right hemisphere in men and in the left hemisphere in boys.

== Handedness differences ==
It has been found that subjects who are left-handed, particularly those who are also ambidextrous, perform better than right-handers on short term memory for the pitch. It was hypothesized that this handedness advantage is due to the fact that left-handers have more duplication of storage in the two hemispheres than do right-handers. Other work has shown that there are pronounced differences between right-handers and left-handers (on a statistical basis) in how musical patterns are perceived, when sounds come from different regions of space. This has been found, for example, in the octave illusion and the scale illusion.

== Musical imagery ==
Musical imagery refers to the experience of replaying music by imagining it inside the head. Musicians show a superior ability for musical imagery due to intense musical training. Herholz, Lappe, Knief and Pantev (2008) investigated the differences in neural processing of a musical imagery task in musicians and non-musicians. Utilizing magnetoencephalography (MEG), Herholz et al. examined differences in the processing of a musical imagery task with familiar melodies in musicians and non-musicians. Specifically, the study examined whether the mismatch negativity (MMN) can be based solely on imagery of sounds. The task involved participants listening to the beginning of a melody, continuation of the melody in his/her head and finally hearing a correct/incorrect tone as further continuation of the melody. The imagery of these melodies was strong enough to obtain an early preattentive brain response to unanticipated violations of the imagined melodies in the musicians. These results indicate similar neural correlates are relied upon for trained musicians imagery and perception. Additionally, the findings suggest that modification of the imagery mismatch negativity (iMMN) through intense musical training results in achievement of a superior ability for imagery and preattentive processing of music.

Perceptual musical processes and musical imagery may share a neural substrate in the brain. A PET study conducted by Zatorre, Halpern, Perry, Meyer and Evans (1996) investigated cerebral blood flow (CBF) changes related to auditory imagery and perceptual tasks. These tasks examined the involvement of particular anatomical regions as well as functional commonalities between perceptual processes and imagery. Similar patterns of CBF changes provided evidence supporting the notion that imagery processes share a substantial neural substrate with related perceptual processes. Bilateral neural activity in the secondary auditory cortex was associated with both perceiving and imagining songs. This implies that within the secondary auditory cortex, processes underlie the phenomenological impression of imagined sounds. The supplementary motor area (SMA) was active in both imagery and perceptual tasks suggesting covert vocalization as an element of musical imagery. CBF increases in the inferior frontal polar cortex and right thalamus suggest that these regions may be related to retrieval and/or generation of auditory information from memory.

== Emotion ==
Music is able to create an intensely pleasurable experience that can be described as "chills". Blood and Zatorre (2001) used PET to measure changes in cerebral blood flow while participants listened to music that they knew to give them the "chills" or any sort of intensely pleasant emotional response. They found that as these chills increase, many changes in cerebral blood flow are seen in brain regions such as the amygdala, orbitofrontal cortex, ventral striatum, midbrain, and the ventral medial prefrontal cortex. Many of these areas appear to be linked to reward, motivation, emotion, and arousal, and are also activated in other pleasurable situations. The resulting pleasure responses enable the release dopamine, serotonin, and oxytocin. Nucleus accumbens (a part of striatum) is involved in both music related emotions, as well as rhythmic timing.

Emotions induced by music activate similar frontal brain regions compared to emotions elicited by other stimuli. Schmidt and Trainor (2001) discovered that valence (i.e. positive vs. negative) of musical segments was distinguished by patterns of frontal EEG activity. Joyful and happy musical segments were associated with increases in left frontal EEG activity whereas fearful and sad musical segments were associated with increases in right frontal EEG activity. Additionally, the intensity of emotions was differentiated by the pattern of overall frontal EEG activity. Overall frontal region activity increased as affective musical stimuli became more intense.

When unpleasant melodies are played, the posterior cingulate cortex activates, which indicates a sense of conflict or emotional pain. The right hemisphere has also been found to be correlated with emotion, which can also activate areas in the cingulate in times of emotional pain, specifically social rejection (Eisenberger). This evidence, along with observations, has led many musical theorists, philosophers and neuroscientists to link emotion with tonality. This seems almost obvious because the tones in music seem like a characterization of the tones in human speech, which indicate emotional content. The vowels in the phonemes of a song are elongated for a dramatic effect, and it seems as though musical tones are simply exaggerations of the normal verbal tonality.

According to the US National Institutes of Health, children and adults who are suffering from emotional trauma have been able to benefit from the use of music in a variety of ways. The therapeutic use of music has been essential in helping children who struggle with focus, anxiety, and cognitive function. Music therapy has also helped children cope with autism, pediatric cancer, and pain from treatments.

== Memory ==
=== Neuropsychology of musical memory ===
Musical memory involves both explicit and implicit memory systems. Explicit musical memory is further differentiated between episodic (where, when and what of the musical experience) and semantic (memory for music knowledge including facts and emotional concepts). Implicit memory centers on the 'how' of music and involves automatic processes such as procedural memory and motor skill learning – in other words skills critical for playing an instrument. Samson and Baird (2009) found that the ability of musicians with Alzheimer's disease to play an instrument (implicit procedural memory) may be preserved.

=== Neural correlates of musical memory ===
A PET study looking into the neural correlates of musical semantic and episodic memory found distinct activation patterns. Semantic musical memory involves the sense of familiarity of songs. The semantic memory for music condition resulted in bilateral activation in the medial and orbital frontal cortex, as well as activation in the left angular gyrus and the left anterior region of the middle temporal gyri. These patterns support the functional asymmetry favouring the left hemisphere for semantic memory. Left anterior temporal and inferior frontal regions that were activated in the musical semantic memory task produced activation peaks specifically during the presentation of musical material, suggestion that these regions are somewhat functionally specialized for musical semantic representations.

Episodic memory of musical information involves the ability to recall the former context associated with a musical excerpt. In the condition invoking episodic memory for music, activations were found bilaterally in the middle and superior frontal gyri and precuneus, with activation predominant in the right hemisphere. Other studies have found the precuneus to become activated in successful episodic recall. As it was activated in the familiar memory condition of episodic memory, this activation may be explained by the successful recall of the melody.

When it comes to memory for pitch, there appears to be a dynamic and distributed brain network subserves pitch memory processes. Gaab, Gaser, Zaehle, Jancke and Schlaug (2003) examined the functional anatomy of pitch memory using functional magnetic resonance imaging (fMRI). An analysis of performance scores in a pitch memory task resulted in a significant correlation between good task performance and the supramarginal gyrus (SMG) as well as the dorsolateral cerebellum. Findings indicate that the dorsolateral cerebellum may act as a pitch discrimination processor and the SMG may act as a short-term pitch information storage site. The left hemisphere was found to be more prominent in the pitch memory task than the right hemispheric regions.

=== Therapeutic effects of music on memory ===
Musical training has been shown to aid memory. Altenmuller et al. studied the difference between active and passive musical instruction and found both that over a longer (but not short) period of time, the actively taught students retained much more information than the passively taught students. The actively taught students were also found to have greater cerebral cortex activation. The passively taught students were not wasting their time; they, along with the active group, displayed greater left hemisphere activity, which is typical in trained musicians.

Research suggests we listen to the same songs repeatedly because of musical nostalgia. One major study, published in the journal Memory & Cognition, found that music enables the mind to evoke memories of the past, known as music-evoked autobiographical memories.

== Attention ==
Treder et al. identified neural correlates of attention when listening to simplified polyphonic music patterns. In a musical oddball experiment, they had participants shift selective attention to one out of three different instruments in music audio clips, with each instrument occasionally playing one or several notes deviating from an otherwise repetitive pattern. Contrasting attended versus unattended instruments, ERP analysis shows subject- and instrument-specific responses including P300 and early auditory components. The attended instrument could be classified offline with high accuracy. This indicates that attention paid to a particular instrument in polyphonic music can be inferred from ongoing EEG, a finding that is potentially relevant for building more ergonomic music-listing based brain-computer interfaces.

== Development ==
Musical four-year-olds have been found to have one greater left hemisphere intrahemispheric coherence. Musicians have been found to have more developed anterior portions of the corpus callosum in a study by Cowell et al. in 1992. This was confirmed by a study by Schlaug et al. in 1995 that found that classical musicians between the ages of 21 and 36 have significantly greater anterior corpora callosa than the non-musical control. Schlaug also found that there was a strong correlation of musical exposure before the age of seven, and a great increase in the size of the corpus callosum. These fibers join together the left and right hemispheres and indicate an increased relaying between both sides of the brain. This suggests the merging between the spatial- emotiono-tonal processing of the right brain and the linguistical processing of the left brain. This large relaying across many different areas of the brain might contribute to music's ability to aid in memory function.

== Impairment ==
=== Focal hand dystonia ===
Focal hand dystonia is a task-related movement disorder associated with occupational activities that require repetitive hand movements. Focal hand dystonia is associated with abnormal processing in the premotor and primary sensorimotor cortices. An fMRI study examined five guitarists with focal hand dystonia. The study reproduced task-specific hand dystonia by having guitarists use a real guitar neck inside the scanner as well as performing a guitar exercise to trigger abnormal hand movement. The dystonic guitarists showed significantly more activation of the contralateral primary sensorimotor cortex as well as a bilateral underactivation of premotor areas. This activation pattern represents abnormal recruitment of the cortical areas involved in motor control. Even in professional musicians, widespread bilateral cortical region involvement is necessary to produce complex hand movements such as scales and arpeggios. The abnormal shift from premotor to primary sensorimotor activation directly correlates with guitar-induced hand dystonia.

=== Music agnosia ===
Music agnosia, an auditory agnosia, is a syndrome of selective impairment in music recognition. Three cases of music agnosia are examined by Dalla Bella and Peretz (1999); C.N., G.L., and I.R.. All three of these patients suffered bilateral damage to the auditory cortex which resulted in musical difficulties while speech understanding remained intact. Their impairment is specific to the recognition of once familiar melodies. They are spared in recognizing environmental sounds and in recognizing lyrics. Peretz (1996) has studied C.N.'s music agnosia further and reports an initial impairment of pitch processing and spared temporal processing. C.N. later recovered in pitch processing abilities but remained impaired in tune recognition and familiarity judgments.

Musical agnosias may be categorized based on the process which is impaired in the individual. Apperceptive music agnosia involves an impairment at the level of perceptual analysis involving an inability to encode musical information correctly. Associative music agnosia reflects an impaired representational system which disrupts music recognition. Many of the cases of music agnosia have resulted from surgery involving the middle cerebral artery. Patient studies have surmounted a large amount of evidence demonstrating that the left side of the brain is more suitable for holding long-term memory representations of music and that the right side is important for controlling access to these representations. Associative music agnosias tend to be produced by damage to the left hemisphere, while apperceptive music agnosia reflects damage to the right hemisphere.

=== Congenital amusia ===
Congenital amusia, otherwise known as tone deafness, is a term for lifelong musical problems which are not attributable to intellectual disability, lack of exposure to music or deafness, or brain damage after birth. Amusic brains have been found in fMRI studies to have less white matter and thicker cortex than controls in the right inferior frontal cortex. These differences suggest abnormal neuronal development in the auditory cortex and inferior frontal gyrus, two areas which are important in musical-pitch processing.

Studies on those with amusia suggest different processes are involved in speech tonality and musical tonality. Congenital amusics lack the ability to distinguish between pitches and so are for example unmoved by dissonance and playing the wrong key on a piano. They also cannot be taught to remember a melody or to recite a song; however, they are still capable of hearing the intonation of speech, for example, distinguishing between "You speak French" and "You speak French?" when spoken.

=== Amygdala damage ===
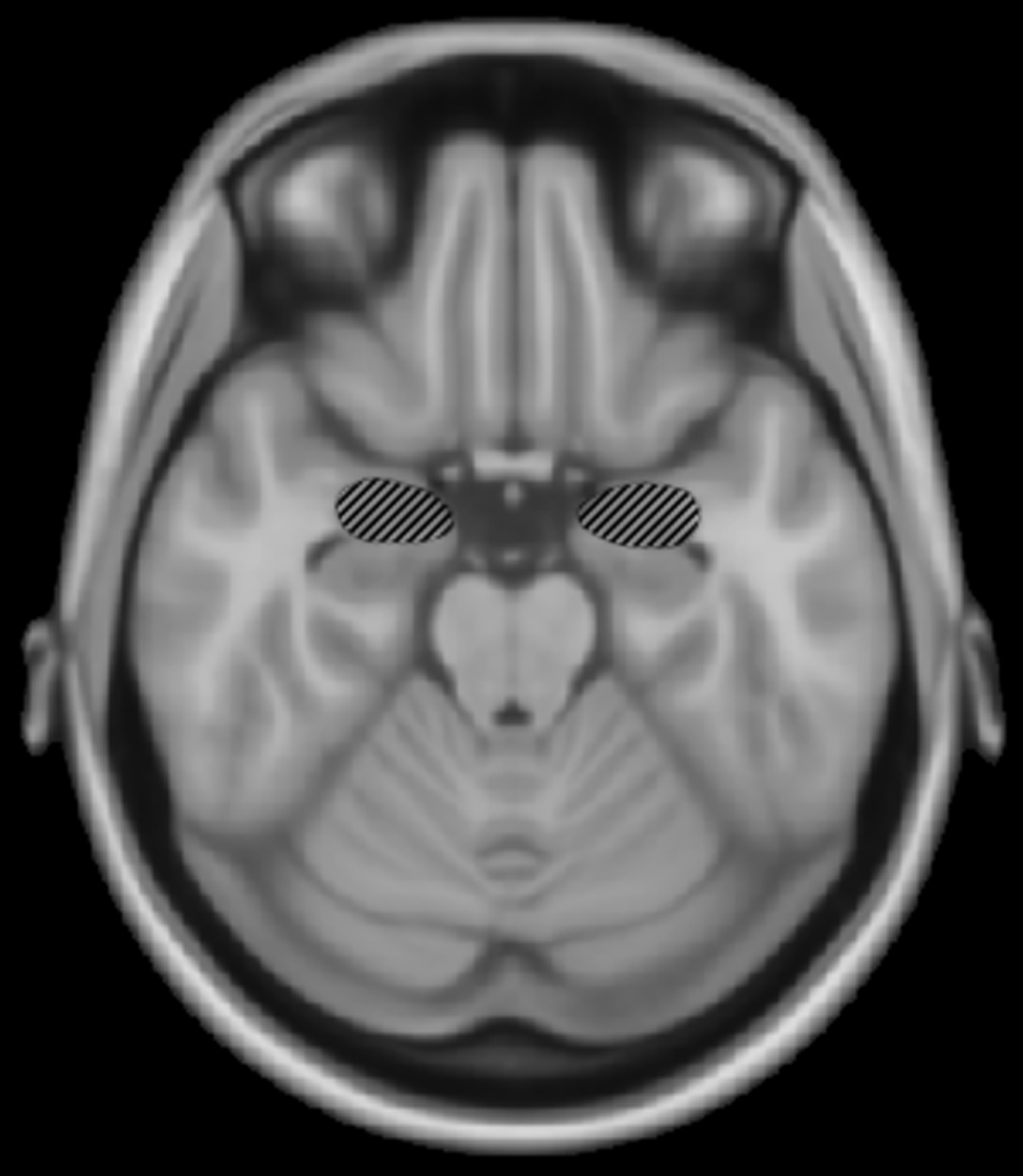
Damage to the amygdala may impair recognition of scary music.

Damage to the amygdala has selective emotional impairments on musical recognition. Gosselin, Peretz, Johnsen and Adolphs (2007) studied S.M., a patient with bilateral damage of the amygdala with the rest of the temporal lobe undamaged and found that S.M. was impaired in recognition of scary and sad music. S.M.'s perception of happy music was normal, as was her ability to use cues such as tempo to distinguish between happy and sad music. It appears that damage specific to the amygdala can selectively impair recognition of scary music.

=== Selective deficit in music reading ===
Specific musical impairments may result from brain damage leaving other musical abilities intact. Cappelletti, Waley-Cohen, Butterworth and Kopelman (2000) studied a single case study of patient P.K.C., a professional musician who sustained damage to the left posterior temporal lobe as well as a small right occipitotemporal lesion. After sustaining damage to these regions, P.K.C. was selectively impaired in the areas of reading, writing and understanding musical notation but maintained other musical skills. The ability to read aloud letters, words, numbers and symbols (including musical ones) was retained. However, P.K.C. was unable to read aloud musical notes on the staff, regardless of whether the task involved naming with the conventional letter or by singing or playing. Yet despite this specific deficit, P.K.C. retained the ability to remember and play familiar and new melodies.

=== Auditory arrhythmia ===
Arrhythmia in the auditory modality is defined as a disturbance of rhythmic sense; and includes deficits such as the inability to rhythmically perform music, the inability to keep time to music and the inability to discriminate between or reproduce rhythmic patterns. A study investigating the elements of rhythmic function examined patient H.J., who acquired arrhythmia after sustaining a right temporoparietal infarct. Damage to this region impaired H.J.'s central timing system which is essentially the basis of his global rhythmic impairment. H.J. was unable to generate steady pulses in a tapping task. These findings suggest that keeping a musical beat relies on functioning in the right temporal auditory cortex.
