= Caroline Palmer =

Canadian cognitive neuroscientist

- Education: University of Michigan; Cornell University
- Occupation: Cognitive neuroscientist

Caroline Palmer is the Distinguished James McGill Professor and held a Canada Research Chair in Cognitive Neuroscience of Performance in the Department of Psychology at McGill University in Montreal, Canada. She is also an Associate Faculty Member in the Schulich School of Music at McGill. Her research in cognitive science addresses the behavioural and neural foundations (learning, memory, motor control, attention) that make it possible for people to produce auditory sequences such as playing a musical instrument or speaking. Palmer has developed and empirically tested computational models of how people perceive and produce auditory sequences, and how they coordinate their actions with others.

== Education ==
Palmer attended the University of Michigan where she received a BSci in psychology with minors in statistics and music. She completed her doctorate in cognitive psychology at Cornell University in 1988 with Carol L. Krumhansl, investigating the cognitive and motor bases of music performance, after which she accepted a faculty position at Ohio State University. She joined the faculty at McGill University in 2003 where she directs the Sequence Production Laboratory.

== Awards and honors ==
Palmer held a FIRST award (NIH) at Ohio State University (1990-1996) for her research on the memory and motor bases of skilled performance. She received the Early Career Award (American Psychological Association, 1996) for her discoveries in rule-governed cognitive bases of musical skill. On joining McGill University (Canada) in 2003, Palmer became the Canada Research Chair in Cognitive Neuroscience of Performance. She is a founding member of the international laboratory for Brain, Music, and Sound research (BRAMS), jointly affiliated with McGill University and Université de Montréal (2005). Palmer directed the NSERC-CREATE training network in Auditory Cognitive Neuroscience (2009-2015) which trained over 200 students in neural and behavioral foundations of auditory processing. Palmer directs a second NSERC-CREATE training network in Complex Dynamics of Brain and Behavior (2017-2024) with 17 industry and governmental partners and 6 Canadian universities. Palmer is a Fellow of the American Psychological Association (2005), the Association for Psychological Science (2011), and the Canadian Society for Brain, Behaviour and Cognitive Sciences (2017). Palmer became a Fellow of the Royal Society of Canada in 2017. Palmer received the Lifetime Achievement Award from the Society for Music Perception and Cognition in 2026.

== Research ==
Palmer's research addresses the nonlinear dynamics underlying the production of auditory sequences (speech and music), with an emphasis on the impact of expertise and disorder. She uses electroencephalography and motion capture techniques to examine the roles of auditory and motor processing in the synchronization of movement to sound, as well as computational techniques to model auditory-motor integration in music and speech production in domains such as beat deafness. Her research program applies principles of nonlinear dynamics to understand how individuals coordinate their actions in groups, as well as the neural bases of interpersonal actions. An important current line of research examines the impact of attractors or states toward which a behavior evolves, often seen in complex systems such as skilled musicians or speakers.

== Selected works ==
- Harding, E.E., Kim, J.C., Demos, A.P., Roman, I.R., Tichko, P., Palmer, C., & Large, E.W. (2025). Musical neurodynamics.
- Palmer, C. & Demos, A.P. (2022). Are we in time? How predictive coding and dynamical systems explain musical synchrony.
- Zamm, A., Wellman, C., & Palmer, C. (2016). Endogenous rhythms influence interpersonal synchrony.
- Goebl, W., & Palmer, C. (2009). Synchronization of timing and motion among performing musicians.
- Palmer, C. & Pfordresher, P.Q. (2003). Incremental planning in sequence production.
- Palmer, C. (1997). Music performance.
