= Carol L. Krumhansl =

Psychologist

Carol L. Krumhansl is a music psychologist, Professor of Psychology at Cornell University. Her work addresses the perception of musical tonality (relationships between tones, chords and keys such as C major or C♯ minor). Her approach is based on empirical cognitive psychology and her research established the meaning of the now common term "tonal hierarchies".

Her interdisciplinary research touches music psychology, music theory and cognitive neuroscience of music. Krumhansl's precise mathematical modeling of tonal and rhythmic musical dimensions has been extended in current models of music perception, memory and performance, most notably by her former students Jamshed Bharucha, Michael Hove, Caroline Palmer, Glenn Schellenberg, and Mark Schmuckler.

Her book, Cognitive Foundations of Musical Pitch (Krumhansl, 1990) has been reviewed by David Huron and is a standard resource for teachers and students of music psychology and one of the discipline's most cited sources.

Her father was James A. Krumhansl, a Cornell physicist.

== Bibliography ==
- Carol L. Krumhansl, Cognitive Foundations of Musical Pitch. Oxford: Oxford University Press. 1990. 307pp. ISBN 0-19-505475-X.
