= Auditory arrhythmia =

Inability to replicate musical or rhythmic patterns

Auditory arrhythmia is the inability to rhythmically perform music, to keep time, and to replicate musical or rhythmic patterns. It has been caused by damage to the cerebrum or rewiring of the brain.

== Characteristics ==
An individual with this condition has an especially difficult time maintaining a steady beat, and even has difficulty following along to a steady rhythm. Before it was a known disorder, it was thought that these individuals were just severely uncoordinated, and therefore were unable to follow along with the music. It has been discovered recently that problems with rhythm in schizophrenia, Parkinson's disease, and attention deficit hyperactivity disorder are also found to have a correlation to rhythm deficiencies.

== Neurological bases of music ==
The cerebellum houses the center for fine motor skills. These are needed in order to play the instrument.

The temporal lobe and the frontal lobe are necessary for listening and recalling different musical aspects from lyrics, reading the music, and performing.

Memory centers are primarily located in the hippocampus, and the process of listening to music originates there.

Neuroplasticity allows the brain to grow and change, especially in the auditory and motor cortex. Listening and playing music helps both of these areas of the brain to develop more, which was found to be correlated to having an improves auditory imagery in many performers in a study conducted at Utrecht University in the Netherlands.

== Similar diagnoses ==
Auditory arrhythmia can also be confused with something called beat deafness. Beat deafness is a form of congenital amusia, which is a person's inability to move in time to the music, or feel a musical rhythm. It is believed by researchers that beat deafness stems from a connection problem between the brain's auditory cortex and inferior frontal lobe. A postdoctoral researcher with the International Laboratory for Brain, Music, and Sound Research at the University of Montreal studied a case where a man could not feel a rhythm in any sense. Not only did he have difficulty dancing, but he was unable to tap his foot or snap his fingers along with the beat of the music. The major difference between beat deafness and auditory arrhythmia, however, is that beat deafness is most likely something you are born with, whereas the arrhythmia most likely comes from damage, which was the case in the research done on "Mathieu," the first known case of beat-deafness. In another case, a former musician known as H.J. had damage from a temporoparietal infarct, which is an area of dead tissue due to lack of adequate blood supply. The infarct was believed to have been caused by a problem during a coronary angiography, which is a test to show the insides of an individual's coronary arteries. H.J. had difficulties with creating a steady beat, an inability to distinguish between different sets of rhythms, and also experienced difficulties when playing his instruments.

== Rhythmic problems in animals other than humans ==
Research was conducted on birds such as the Zebra Finch because this species has parallels to humans' vocal learning patterns and neurological structures. Adult zebra finches were placed in similar conditions, all exposed to nine rhythmic and nine arrhythmic songs for 30 second increments. After the stimulus was presented, the brains were studied for areas of high ZENK concentration, ZENK being an immunohistochemical used to detect neural activation. It was found in the finches that those exposed to the arrhythmic music had much higher levels of the ZENK gene, and it has been discovered that there is a correlation with humans having higher brain activity in these locations with arrhythmic functioning. Gaining an understanding of how to change the deficiencies in these animals can help lead to changes in the future for humans with auditory arrhythmia and other serious psychiatric disorders.

== Auditory processing in those with autism ==
Those diagnosed with autism tend to have many difficulties processing auditory stimuli. For example, they most often experience language and speech delays, hyperacusis, have difficulties communicating in large social groups, and may experience difficulties hearing certain voices in a noisy environment. These qualities make quality of life difficult, by inhibiting their ability to fully participate in social and educational circumstances in various parts of their lives. As shown in research published in the International Journal of Psychophysiology, efferent pathways throughout the brain help to control various functions throughout the body. For example, in those with autism, pathways running through to the middle ear muscles make it difficult for the person to focus on a single voice when there is a lot of background noise. Raising eyelids was also found to hinder the stapedius muscle by tensing it, which in turn makes it difficult for these individuals to hear other talking when there is background noise present. The laryngeal and pharyngeal muscles located in the throat make prosody and intonation difficult to understand for autistic people. During research, tasks and tests were conducted to see if there is a correlation between cardiac rhythms, respiratory sinus arrhythmias, and auditory processing, or auditory arrhythmia. Because these symptoms tend to go hand in hand, researchers were looking to see if there was a possibility of improving auditory processing. If researchers learn how to effectively improve auditory sensations in autistic people, then there is a possibility that they can then begin finding the improvement for those only with auditory arrhythmia.

== Recent research ==
The Easter Seals Metropolitan Chicago Therapeutic School and Center for Autism Research has conducted studies on auditory processing in individuals with autism. The International Laboratory for Brain, Music, and Sound Research at the University of Montreal has found that beat and tone deafness are likely genetic, and believe that it is because of a miswiring between the auditory cortex and inferior frontal cortex. They were also major researchers on Mathieu's case of beat deafness. Studies conducted at Utrecht University in the Netherlands show that there is an association with an improves ability for auditory imagery and music. McGill University also studied Mathieu's case, along with another individual known as Marjorie. The studies conducted show that true beat deafness is an extremely rare disorder, because out of all the individuals who applied thinking they were beat deaf, Marjorie and Mathieu were the only two. H.J.'s case has been studied in Victoria, Australia at the University of Melbourne and La Trobe University. The data collected caused researchers to believe that the right temporal auditory cortex plays a large role in an individual's ability to maintain a steady rhythm, and has provided a platform for future neuropsychological research.
