= Tritone paradox =

Auditory illusion

The tritone paradox is an auditory illusion in which a sequentially played pair of Shepard tones separated by an interval of a tritone, or half octave, is heard as ascending by some people and as descending by others. Different populations tend to favor one of a limited set of different spots around the chromatic circle as central to the set of "higher" tones. Roger Shepard in 1963 had argued that such tone pairs would be heard ambiguously as either ascending or descending. However, psychology of music researcher Diana Deutsch in 1986 discovered that when the judgments of individual listeners were considered separately, their judgments depended on the positions of the tones along the chromatic circle. For example, one listener would hear the tone pair C–F♯ as ascending and the tone pair G–C♯ as descending. Yet another listener would hear the tone pair C–F♯ as descending and the tone pair G–C♯ as ascending. Furthermore, the way these tone pairs were perceived varied depending on the listener's language or dialect.

Each Shepard tone consists of a set of octave-related sinusoids, whose amplitudes are scaled by a fixed bell-shaped spectral envelope based on a log frequency scale. For example, one tone might consist of a sinusoid at 440 Hz, accompanied by sinusoid at the higher octaves (880 Hz, 1760 Hz, etc.) and lower octaves (220 Hz, 110 Hz, etc.). The other tone might consist of a 311 Hz sinusoid, again accompanied by higher and lower octaves (622 Hz, 155.5 Hz, etc.). The amplitudes of the sinusoids of both complexes are determined by the same fixed-amplitude envelope—for example, the envelope might be centered at 370 Hz and span a six-octave range.

Shepard predicted that the two tones would constitute a bistable figure, the auditory equivalent of the Necker cube, that could be heard ascending or descending, but never both at the same time. Diana Deutsch later found that perception of which tone was higher depended on the absolute frequencies involved: an individual will usually find the same tone to be higher, and this is determined by the tones' absolute pitches. This is consistently done by a large portion of the population, despite the fact that responding to different tones in different ways must involve the ability to hear absolute pitch, which was thought to be rare. This finding has been used to argue that latent absolute-pitch ability is present in a large proportion of the population. In addition, Deutsch found that subjects from the south of England and from California resolved the ambiguity the opposite way. Also, Deutsch, Henthorn and Dolson found that native speakers of Vietnamese, a tonal language, heard the tritone paradox differently from Californians who were native speakers of English.

== See also ==
- Barberpole illusion
- Flanging
- Missing fundamental
