= James A. Krumhansl =

American physicist

- Born: August 2, 1919; Cleveland, Ohio, United States
- Died: May 6, 2004 (aged 84); Lebanon, New Hampshire, United States
- Education: University of Dayton; Case Western Reserve University; Cornell University
- Children: Carol L. Krumhansl; James L. Krumhansl; Peter A. Krumhansl
- Awards: Guggenheim Fellowship; Fulbright Scholarship
- Scientific career
- Workplaces: Cornell University

James Arthur Krumhansl (August 2, 1919 – May 6, 2004) was an American physicist who specialized in condensed matter physics and materials science. He spent much of his career at Cornell University. He also served as president of the American Physical Society and assistant director for mathematics, physical sciences, and engineering for the National Science Foundation. In 1987 he testified before Congress that the Superconducting Super Collider would be too costly.

== Personal life ==
Krumhansl was born August 2, 1919, in Cleveland, Ohio. He married twice; each marriage ended in divorce. He had three children: Carol L. Krumhansl, James L. Krumhansl, and Peter A. Krumhansl.

== Education ==
Krumhansl did his undergraduate work in electrical engineering at the University of Dayton, earning a B.S. in 1939. He went on to receive an M.S. from Case Western Reserve University in 1940 and a Ph.D. from Cornell University in 1943. Both graduate degrees were in physics. His doctoral dissertation concerns the klystron.

== Career ==
After earning his Ph.D. Krumhansl spent one year as an instructor in physics at Cornell. In 1944 he left Cornell for the Stromberg-Carlson Company, where he researched microwave pulse communication systems for the U.S. Navy during World War II. He remained at Stromberg-Carlson until 1946, when he became an assistant professor of physics and applied mathematics at Brown University. He was promoted to associate professor in 1947. In 1948 he moved back to Cornell as an assistant professor of physics and was promoted to associate professor in 1950. In 1955 he returned to industry as a research director for the National Carbon Company.

In 1959 Krumhansl became a full professor of physics at Cornell. From 1960 to 1964 he directed the university's Laboratory of Atomic and Solid State Physics. He was named the Horace White Professor of Physics in 1981. Before retiring in 1990, he also held visiting appointments at the University of Oxford, the University of Cambridge, and the University of Pennsylvania. In retirement he held adjunct professorships at the University of Massachusetts Amherst and Dartmouth College.

During his career Krumhansl had several opportunities to serve the academic physics community. He was the editor-in-chief of the Journal of Applied Physics from 1958 to 1964 and of Physical Review Letters from 1974 to 1977. From 1973 to 1978 he served on the governing board of the American Institute of Physics. He chaired the American Physical Society's Division of Condensed Matter Physics and was the society's president from 1989 to 1990. As President he advocated for more visas and immigration opportunities for Chinese scholars following the Tiananmen square massacre of 1989.

Krumhansl was also active in government service through much of his career. He served on advisory committees for the U.S. Atomic Energy Commission from 1954 to 1959. Soon after, he and Robb Thomson co-founded the Defense Advanced Research Projects Agency's Materials Research Council. From 1975 to 1979 he was a senior fellow at Los Alamos National Laboratory, where he served as a consultant to the laboratory's director. In 1977 President Jimmy Carter appointed him assistant director for mathematics, physical sciences, and engineering for the National Science Foundation, a position he held until 1979.

Krumhansl received a Guggenheim Fellowship in 1959. He also traveled to Yugoslavia as a Fulbright Scholar. He served on the science advisory board of Allied Corporation from 1979 to 1987, and on that company's board of directors from 1980 to 1987.

== Research ==
Krumhansl worked primarily in theoretical condensed matter physics and materials science. During his time at Penn he and John Robert Schrieffer formulated an influential model of structural phase transitions based in statistical mechanics. He also did important work on crystal twinning in martensite with Gerhard Barsch. He was also known for his research on phonons, solitons, and material defects. His broad interests, spanning not only his own areas of physics but also information theory, applied mathematics, metallurgy, and biophysics, led him to characterize himself as a "gadfly".

== Congressional testimony ==
In 1987, while serving as the American Physical Society's President-elect, Krumhansl testified before the Science Committee of the U.S. House of Representatives, arguing against building the Superconducting Super Collider. In his view, the collider would be so expensive that it would drain funds from other worthy research. As his Cornell colleague James P. Sethna put it, Krumhansl "valued the science of the supercollider highly, but he did not value it a thousand times more than other fields of science." Congress canceled the collider project in 1993 after completing one-fifth of it at a cost of $2 billion.

== Later years and legacy ==
After retiring from Cornell, Krumhansl moved to Amherst, Massachusetts, and later Hanover, New Hampshire. He died May 6, 2004, at Dartmouth–Hitchcock Medical Center in Lebanon, New Hampshire, following a stroke, one month after giving an invited lecture at a conference in Santa Fe, New Mexico. Cornell established a postdoctoral fellowship in his memory, and Los Alamos held a memorial symposium in January 2005.
