= Sharawadji effect =

The sharawadji effect is a musical perception or phenomenon regarding timbre and texture described by Claude Shryer as "a sensation of plenitude sometimes created by the contemplation of a complex soundscape whose beauty is inexplicable." Sharawadji is not a stimulus, but rather a reaction to a stimulus. Shryer described searching for this "state of awareness" by "tend[ing] an open ear in the hopes of experiencing the sublime beauty of a given sound in an unexpected context." The experience of the sharawadji sonic effect is often heavily dictated by personal context as well as the perception of the listener. One example of this effect is the appreciation of the sound of rumbling thunder: those who are directly exposed to the elements would be more likely to fear it compared to those who experience the sound while in a safe environment. Simply understood, "sharawadji sounds belong to everyday life, to a known musical style. They become sharawadji only through decontextualization, through a rupture of meaning."

== Origin ==
Seventeenth-century European travelers originally coined the term as an aesthetic effect that "comes about as a surprise and will carry you elsewhere, beyond strict representation — out of context." The term sharawadji was said to originate from China and was understood as "the beauty that occurs with no discernible order or arrangement."

"All of us are searching for that enveloping soundscape that takes us beyond to indescribable realms of beauty, what the Persian philosophers once called the sharawadji effect."

== See also ==
- Auditory illusion
- Musique concrète
