= Auditory illusion =

False perceptions of a real sound or outside stimulus

Auditory illusions are illusions of real sound or outside stimulus. These false perceptions are the equivalent of an optical illusion: the listener hears either sounds which are not present in the stimulus, or sounds that should not be possible given the circumstance on how they were created.

Humans are fairly susceptible to illusions, despite an innate ability to process complex stimuli. Confirmation bias is believed to be largely responsible for the inaccurate judgments that people make when evaluating information, given that humans typically interpret and recall information that appeals to their own biases. Amongst these misinterpretations, known as illusions, falls the category of auditory illusions. The brain uses multiple senses simultaneously to process information, spatial information is processed with greater detail and accuracy in vision than in hearing. Auditory illusions highlight areas where the human ear and brain, as organic survival tools, differentiate from perfect audio receptors; this shows that it is possible for a human being to hear something that is not there and be able to react to the sound they supposedly heard. When someone is experiencing an auditory illusion, their brain is falsely interpreting its surroundings and distorting their perception of the world around them.

== Causes ==
Many auditory illusions, particularly of music and of speech, result from hearing sound patterns that are highly probable, even though they are heard incorrectly. This is due to the influence of our knowledge and experience of many sounds we have heard. In order to prevent hearing echo created by perceiving multiple sounds coming from different spaces, the human auditory system relates the sounds as being from one source. However, that does not prevent people from being fooled by auditory illusions. Sounds that are found in words are called embedded sounds, and these sounds are the cause of some auditory illusions. A person's perception of a word can be influenced by the way they see the speaker's mouth move, even if the sound they hear is unchanged. For example, if someone is looking at two people saying "far" and "bar", the word they will hear will be determined by who they look at. If these sounds are played in a loop, the listener will be able to hear different words inside the same sound. People with brain damage can be more susceptible to auditory illusions and they can become more common for that person.

== In music ==
Composers have long been using the spatial components of music to alter the overall sound experienced by the listener. One of the more common methods of sound synthesis is the use of combination tones. Combination tones are illusions that are not physically present as sound waves, but rather, they are created by one's own neuromechanics. According to Purwins, auditory illusions have been used effectively by the following: Beethoven (Leonore Overture), Berg (Wozzeck), Krenek (Spiritus Intelligentiae, Sanctus), Ligeti (Études), Violin Concerto, Double Concerto, for flute, oboe and orchestra), Honegger (Pacific 231), and Stahnke (Partota 12).

== Examples ==
There are a multitude of examples out in the world of auditory illusions. These are examples of some auditory illusions:

Risset's rhythmic effect. Forever accelerating beat.

A Shepard–Risset glissando

- Binaural beats
- The constant spectrum melody
- Deutsch's scale illusion
- Electronic voice phenomenon: a special case of auditory pareidolia
- Franssen effect
- Glissando illusion
- Illusory continuity of tones
- Illusory discontinuity
- Hearing a missing fundamental frequency, given other parts of the harmonic series
- Various psychoacoustic tricks of lossy audio compression
- McGurk effect
- Octave illusion/Deutsch's high–low illusion
- Auditory pareidolia: hearing indistinct voices in random noise.
- The Shepard–Risset tone or scale, and the Deutsch tritone paradox
- Speech-to-song illusion
- Yanny or Laurel

== See also ==
- Auditory system
- Barber pole – auditory illusions compared to visual illusions
- Diana Deutsch
- Doppler effect – not an illusion, but real physical phenomenon
- Holophonics
- Jean-Claude Risset
- Musical acoustics
- Phantom rings
- Pitch circularity
- Psychoacoustics
- Sharawadji effect
- Tinnitus
