= August Knoblauch =

German neurologist

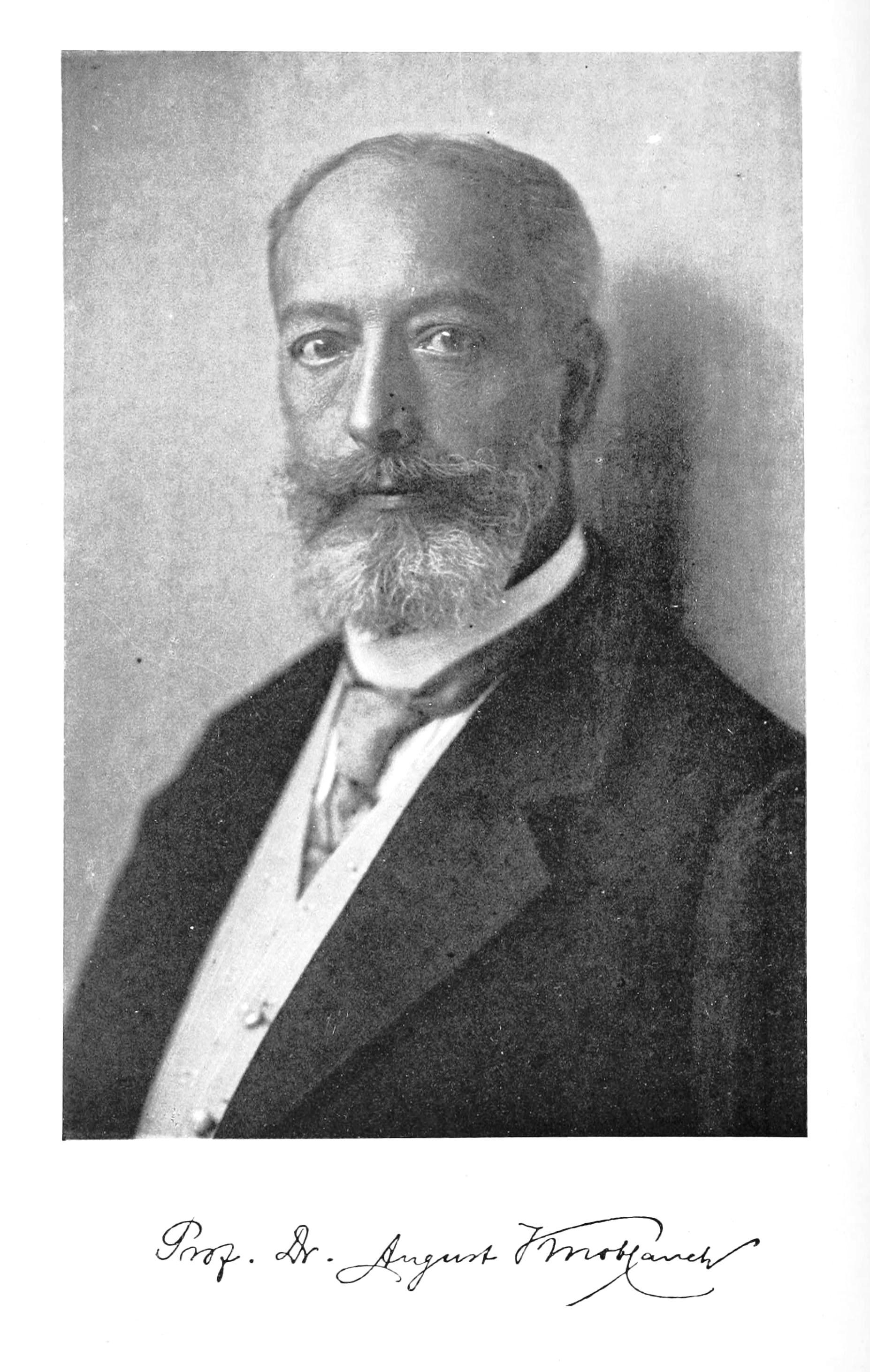
August Knoblauch

August Knoblauch (8 January 1863 in Frankfurt am Main – 24 August 1919 in Frankfurt am Main) was a German neurologist. He was a nephew of chemist August Kekulé.

He studied medicine and sciences at the universities of Berlin, Bonn, Strasbourg and Heidelberg. In 1888 he received his doctorate at the University of Heidelberg, where he studied under neurologist Wilhelm Heinrich Erb. In 1898 he was named head of the city infirmary in Frankfurt, then in 1914 was named director of the neurological clinic at the University of Frankfurt am Main.

In 1893 he was named first secretary at the Senckenbergischen Naturforschenden Gesellschaft in Frankfurt, where he later served as second director (from 1896) and first director (from 1899).

He is best remembered for his research on the cognitive function regarding music; in 1888/90 he put forth a detailed diagrammatic model of music processing, and postulated the existence of nine disorders of music production and perception. He is credited with coining the term "amusia" — being defined as the inability to recognize musical tones or being unable to reproduce them.

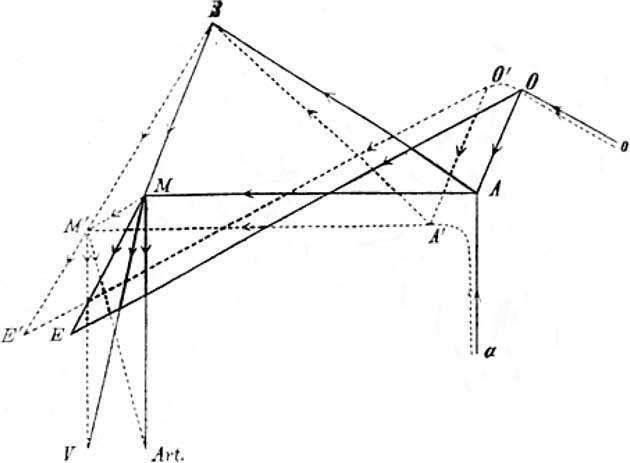
"Knoblauch-Lichtheim schema"; Knoblauch's diagrammatic model of music overlaid on Ludwig Lichtheim's model of language.

== Selected works ==
- Ueber Störungen der musikalischen Leistungsfähigkeit infolge von Gehirnläsionen (1888) – On disorders of musical ability as a result of brain lesions.
- Klinik und Atlas der chronischen Krankheiten des Zentralnervensystems (1909) – Clinic and atlas of chronic diseases of the central nervous system.
- Die Allgemeine chirurgie der gehirnkrankheiten; with Fedor Krause, Korbinian Brodmann and Alfred Hauptmann, (1914) – General surgery associated with brain disorders.
- Anatomie und Topographie des Gehirns und seiner Häute (1914).
