= Illusory discontinuity =

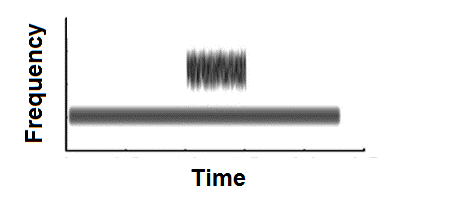
Example of illusory discontinuity stimulus: continuous tone with spectrally remote noise. The tone sounds discontinuous to some listeners.

Example of illusory discontinuity stimulus: continuous tone with spectrally remote noise. The tone sounds discontinuous to some listeners.

Illusory discontinuity is an auditory illusion in which a continuous ongoing sound becomes inaudible during a brief, non-masking noise. The illusion is perceived only by some listeners, but not by others, reflecting individual variation in hearing abilities. It has been estimated that among young adults 24% are susceptible to illusory discontinuity. The most susceptible listeners describe their sensations in terms of the sound actually containing a physical gap. The illusory discontinuity is strongest when the interrupting sound is short (50ms). Longer sounds elicit weaker illusory discontinuity; this effect may be related to better auditory segregation.

== Relation to other auditory illusions ==
Illusory discontinuity is antagonistic with illusory continuity of tones (auditory filling-in). While illusory continuity restores perceptual continuity of obscured sounds, illusory discontinuity disrupts the perception even if the sound is indeed continuous. Listeners strongly susceptible to illusory discontinuity do not perceive illusory auditory continuity.

== Relation to auditory masking ==
The illusion is likely to be a novel form of informational masking (broadly defined as a degradation of auditory detection or discrimination of a signal embedded in a context of other similar sounds). Illusory discontinuity cannot be explained by simultaneous masking, because it appears even if the noise is as far as one octave away.

== Relation to auditory stream segregation ==
It has been suggested that illusory discontinuity is related to inability to segregate the ongoing sound from the interrupting noise, although more research is needed to prove this.

== Physiology ==
The mechanism of the illusory discontinuity is unknown. An electroencephalographic study has demonstrated that participants who were not prone to illusory discontinuity showed robust early neural responses at 40–66 ms after noise burst onset, whereas those prone to the illusion lacked these early responses. This suggests that the individual variability in perceiving discontinuity illusion is related to neural processing of the interrupting sound.

== See also ==
- Auditory illusion
- Auditory masking
- Auditory scene analysis
- Electroencephalography
- Illusory continuity of tones
