= Illusory continuity of tones =

Auditory illusion

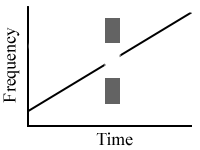
An ascending tone is interrupted by a noise burst, but is perceptually continuous.

Example of illusory continuity stimulus: discontinuous rising tone. The tone sounds continuous to some listeners.

The illusory continuity of tones is the auditory illusion caused when a tone is interrupted for a short time, during which a narrow band of noise is played. The noise has to be of a sufficiently high level to effectively mask the gap, unless it is a gap transfer illusion. Whether the tone is of constant, rising or decreasing pitch, the ear perceives the tone as continuous if the discontinuity is masked by noise. Because the human ear is very sensitive to sudden changes, however, it is necessary for the success of the illusion that the amplitude of the tone in the region of the discontinuity not decrease or increase too abruptly. While the inner mechanisms of this illusion are not well understood, there is evidence that supports activation of primarily the auditory cortex is present.

== Relation to Other Auditory Illusions ==
Illusory continuity is antagonistic with illusory discontinuity. While illusory continuity restores perceptual continuity of obscured sounds, illusory discontinuity disrupts the perception even if the sound is indeed continuous. Listeners strongly susceptible to illusory discontinuity do not perceive illusory auditory continuity.

== Requirements of the Illusion ==
Auditory induction in the brain is used to create a sense of illusory continuity, when a background noise is interrupted by a foreground noise. Even when the foreground noise is completely removed and replaced, listeners still report being able to hear the foreground sound that was removed. This is true with speech, which is done using prior knowledge of speech patterns from mere exposure. However, the neural networks often show no sign of interruption when this occurs. Even when the sound is completely removed and replaced, the neural networks show no sign of the sound being interrupted. There does seem to be limitations to this, however, as the sound that masks the original foreground stimulus needs to have appropriate composition and intensity. The illusion is dependent on all of the factors involved with the illusion, not just the individual components of the illusion. The foreground and background noise must both be fitting to the criteria required for this illusion, and not just one or the other.

Essentially, a sound in the foreground that is interrupted without the gap being filled by some other background noise is perceived is discontinuous, but if another sound is present during this gap, the sound is perceived as continuous. This effect is dependent on the duration, loudness, and bandwidth of the noise, with loud, short gap having the strongest illusory effect. If the gap is too long or the occluding sound too short, the illusory effect will wear off.

== The Brain and the Illusion ==
Animal models suggest that the auditory cortex is the primary cause for this auditory illusion. However, it has been shown that the human brainstem also supports auditory continuity even before the auditory cortex is involved.

Other areas of the brain that are involved in this illusion are the left posterior angular gyrus, superior temporal sulcus, Broca's area, and the anterior insula. These brain regions "repair" the lost sound using past experiences and context subconsciously, creating this illusion. The brain takes in the context that is given before the sound is obscured, and these areas of the brain work to "fill in" that gap with prior knowledge.

== The Gap Transfer Illusion ==
The gap transfer illusion is very similar to this illusion; it is where an ascending tone is interrupted by another descending tone, yet only the ascending tone is perceived when the two tones intersect. This occurs only when the crossing slides have the same slope, sound spectrum, intensity (or possibly slightly lower for descending tone), and sound pressure level. This illusion causes an illusion of two tones intersecting into one. This gap needs to be about 40 ms or less. This seems to be the only way that a soundless gap is perceived, usually an occluding sound must be present for the sound to have an illusory effect.
