= Beat deafness =

Inability to distinguish musical rhythm

Beat deafness is a form of congenital amusia characterized by a person's inability to distinguish musical rhythm or move in time to it.

== Characteristics ==
Generally, humans have the ability to hear musical beat and rhythm beginning in infancy. Some people, however, are unable to identify beat and rhythm of music, suffering from what is known as beat deafness. Beat deafness is a newly discovered form of congenital amusia, in which people lack the ability to identify or “hear” the beat in a piece of music. Unlike most hearing impairments in which an individual is unable to hear any sort of sound stimuli, those with beat deafness are generally able to hear normally, but unable to identify beat and rhythm in music. Those with beat deafness are also unable to dance in step to any type of music. Even people who do not dance well can at least coordinate their movements to the song they are listening to, because they can easily keep time to the beat.

== Rarity ==
The first reported case of beat deafness was of a Canadian graduate student, whom researchers have identified as “Mathieu”. Phillips-Silver et al. (2011) examined the human ability to recognize musical beat in a sample of individuals who had had no previous musical training in their lives. The researchers presented a series of songs from different genres and the participants were instructed to simply bounce up and down to the beat of the music. Results indicated that all participants except for Mathieu were able to move in sync with the beat of the music. The researchers also presented video clips which showed a person dancing to music. Mathieu could not identify when the person was or was not dancing in time to the music. Other participants demonstrated no problem with this task.

== Neural basis ==
When sound waves reach the ears, the energy they contain is converted into electrical signals, which are sent via the auditory nerves to the brain. Sound processing begins when these electrical signals reach the primary auditory receiving area in the core part of the temporal lobe. Signals then travel to the area surrounding the core, known as the belt area, and are then transmitted to the parabelt area, which is located next to the belt. Simple sounds such as pure tones are able to activate the core area of the brain, but both the belt and parabelt areas are activated by only complex sounds, such as those found in speech and music. The auditory cortex in the left hemisphere of the brain is responsible for processing beat and rhythm in music. The right auditory cortex is primarily used in distinguishing between different harmonics, which are simple pure tones that combine to create complex tones.

Phillips-Silver et al. (2011) propose that beat deafness is the result of neurological problems in the areas of the brain that are used for recognizing musical beat, rhythm, and time. The main area responsible for processing musical rhythm is the left auditory cortex, however other areas are most likely involved as well. According to the hypothesis of Phillips-Silver and coworkers, it should therefore be functional abnormalities in the left auditory cortex that cause beat deafness.

Other areas of Mathieu's brain appeared to be functioning normally, including the areas responsible for hearing in general and for motor control, which is used in performing the moves in dancing. Mathieu's deficiencies are therefore not caused by the inability to hear efficiently or control the movement of his body while dancing. Beat deafness has also not been shown to affect other areas of cognitive function such as language, which does not involve any sort of underlying beat or sporadic rhythm changes that are associated with music. Given the normal functioning of Mathieu's brain, the hypothesis about the beat perception deficit occurring in the brain area for rhythm processing in particular is most likely correct.

Beat deafness is however, a very recent discovery and further research is necessary in gaining complete understanding of the phenomenon and its underlying brain processes. In 2016 a study was published that examined the neural correlates of beat perception in two beat-deaf individuals, Mathieu and Marjorie, and a group of control participants. It provided partial support for abnormalities in later cognitive stages of beat processing, reflected in an unreliable P3b component exhibited by Mathieu—but not Marjorie—compared to control participants.

== Comparison to tone deafness ==
Tone deafness is characterized by the inability to discriminate between different pitches, which are directly related to the frequencies of sound waves. Tone deafness is a related, but distinct disorder from beat deafness. People with tone deafness can recognize beat and can move in time to music, but they cannot perceive pitch. People with beat deafness on the other hand, can recognize and distinguish between different tones as well as the average person and can usually sing in tune, so musical pitch is not the issue. Different areas of the brain in the auditory cortex are involved in the perception of musical pitch and melody. Researchers theorize that tone deafness can potentially be from any of these sections. Both beat deafness and tone deafness are derived from these same areas within the brain.

== Beat perception in animals ==
A research team led by Aniruddh D. Patel of The Neurosciences Institute concluded that sulphur-crested cockatoos have the ability to perceive the beat in music and are able to rhythmically move to the tempo of the music as it changes. Only vocal learning species such as dolphins and parrots are hypothesized to have the ability to perceive beat. This is because beat perception and movement rely on complex vocal learning which require motor and auditory circuits in the brain. Vocal learning and beat perception do some overlapping in the parts of the brain that account auditory and motor areas. There is no significant evidence for beat perception in nonvocal learning species such as dogs and cats. However, California sea lions, a nonvocal learning animal, have demonstrated the ability to perceive beats in music.

== See also ==
- Amusia
- Tone deafness
- Musical aptitude
- Cognitive neuroscience of music
