= Amusia =

- Specialty: Neurology

Amusia, also called being tone-deaf, is a musical disorder that appears mainly as a defect in processing pitch but also encompasses musical memory and recognition. Two main classifications of amusia exist: acquired amusia, which occurs as a result of brain damage, and congenital amusia, which results from a music-processing anomaly present since birth.

Studies have shown that congenital amusia is a deficit in fine-grained pitch discrimination. Early estimates suggested that 4% of the population has this disorder. More recent direct counts based on a sample of 20,000 people indicate a true rate closer to 1.5%. Acquired amusia may take several forms. Patients with brain damage may experience the loss of ability to produce musical sounds while sparing speech, much like aphasics lose speech selectively but can sometimes still sing. Other forms of amusia may affect specific sub-processes of music processing. Current research has demonstrated dissociations between rhythm, melody, and emotional processing of music. Amusia may include impairment of any combination of these skill sets.

== Signs and symptoms ==
Symptoms of amusia are generally categorized as receptive, clinical, or mixed. Symptoms of receptive amusia, sometimes referred to as "musical deafness" or "tone deafness", include the inability to recognize familiar melodies, the loss of ability to read musical notation, and the inability to detect wrong or out-of tune notes. Clinical, or expressive, symptoms include the loss of ability to sing, write musical notation, and/or play an instrument. A mixed disorder is a combination of expressive and receptive impairment.

Clinical symptoms of acquired amusia are much more variable than those of congenital amusia and are determined by the location and nature of the lesion. Brain injuries may affect motor or expressive functioning, including the ability to sing, whistle, or hum a tune (oral-expressive amusia), the ability to play an instrument (instrumental amusia or musical apraxia), and the ability to write music (musical agraphia). Additionally, brain damage to the receptive dimension affects the faculty to discriminate tunes (receptive or sensorial amusia), the ability to read music (musical alessia), and the ability to identify songs that were familiar prior to the brain damage (amnesic amusia).

Those with congenital amusia show impaired performance on discrimination, identification and imitation of sentences with intonational differences in pitch direction in their final word. This suggests that amusia can in subtle ways impair language processing.

=== Social and emotional ===
Amusic individuals have a remarkable sparing of emotional responses to music in the context of severe and lifelong deficits in processing music. Some individuals with amusia describe music as unpleasant. Others simply refer to it as noise and find it annoying. This can have social implications because amusics often try to avoid music, which in many social situations is not an option.

In China and other countries where tonal languages are spoken, amusia may have the more pronounced social and emotional impact of experiencing difficulty in speaking and understanding the language. However, context clues are often strong enough to determine the correct meaning, similarly to how homophones can be understood.

=== Related diseases ===
Amusia has been classified as a learning disability that affects musical abilities. Research suggests that in congenital amusia, younger subjects can be taught tone differentiation techniques. This finding leads researchers to believe that amusia is related to dyslexia and other similar disorders. Research has been shown that amusia may be related to an increase in size of the cerebral cortex, which may be a result of a malformation in cortical development. Conditions such as dyslexia and epilepsy are due to a malformation in cortical development and also lead to an increase in cortical thickness, which leads researchers to believe that congenital amusia may be caused by the identical phenomenon in a different area of the brain.

Amusia is also similar to aphasia in that they affect similar areas of the brain near the temporal lobe. Most cases of those with amusia do not show any symptoms of aphasia. However, a number of cases have shown that those who have aphasia can exhibit symptoms of amusia, especially in acquired aphasia. The two are not mutually exclusive, nor does having one imply possession of the other. In acquired amusia, inability to perceive music correlates with an inability to perform other higher-level functions. In this case, as musical ability improves, so too do the higher cognitive functions which suggests that musical ability is closely related to these higher-level functions, such as memory and learning, mental flexibility, and semantic fluency.

Amusia can also be related to aprosody, a disorder in which the person's speech is affected, becoming extremely monotonous. It has been found that both amusia and aprosody can arise from seizures occurring in the non-dominant hemisphere. They can also both arise from lesions to the brain, as can Broca's aphasia come about simultaneously with amusia from injury. There is a relation between musical abilities and the components of speech; however, it is not understood very well.

== Diagnosis ==
The diagnosis of amusia requires multiple investigative tools all described in the Montreal Protocol for Identification of Amusia. This protocol has at its center the Montreal Battery of Evaluation of Amusia (MBEA), which involves a series of tests that evaluate the use of musical characteristics known to contribute to the memory and perception of conventional music, but the protocol also allows for the ruling out of other conditions that can explain the clinical signs observed. The battery comprises six subtests which assess the ability to discriminate pitch contour, musical scales, pitch intervals, rhythm, meter, and memory. An individual is considered amusic if they perform two standard deviations below the mean obtained by musically competent controls.

This musical pitch disorder represents a phenotype that serves to identify the associated neuro-genetic factors. Both MRI-based brain structural analyses and electroencephalography (EEG) are common methods employed to uncover brain anomalies associated with amusia (See Neuroanatomy). Additionally, voxel-based morphometry (VBM) is used to detect anatomical differences between the MRIs of amusic brains and musically intact brains, specifically with respect increased and/or decreased amounts of white and grey matter.

=== Congenital amusia ===
Congenital amusia, commonly known as tone deafness or a tin ear, refers to a musical disability that cannot be explained by prior brain lesion, hearing loss, cognitive defects, or lack of environmental stimulation, and it affects about 4% of the population. Individuals with congenital amusia seem to lack the musical predispositions with which most people are born. They are unable to recognize or hum familiar tunes even if they have normal audiometry and above-average intellectual and memory skills. Also, they do not show sensitivity to dissonant chords in a melodic context, which, as discussed earlier, is one of the musical predispositions exhibited by infants. The hallmark of congenital amusia is a deficit in fine-grained pitch discrimination, and this deficit is most apparent when congenital amusics are asked to pick out a wrong note in a given melody. If the distance between two successive pitches is small, congenital amusics are not able to detect a pitch change. As a result of this defect in pitch perception, a lifelong musical impairment may emerge due to a failure to internalize musical scales. A lack of fine-grained pitch discrimination makes it extremely difficult for amusics to enjoy and appreciate music, which consists largely of small pitch changes.

Tone-deaf people seem to be disabled only when it comes to music as they can fully interpret the prosody or intonation of human speech. Tone deafness has a strong negative correlation with belonging to societies with tonal languages. This could be evidence that the ability to reproduce and distinguish between notes may be a learned skill; conversely, it may suggest that the genetic predisposition towards accurate pitch discrimination may influence the linguistic development of a population towards tonality. A correlation between allele frequencies and linguistic typological features has been recently discovered, supporting the latter hypothesis.

Tone deafness is also associated with other musical-specific impairments such as the inability to keep time with music (beat deafness, or the lack of rhythm), or the inability to remember or recognize a song. These disabilities can appear separately, but some research shows that they are more likely to appear in tone-deaf people. Experienced musicians, such as W. A. Mathieu, have addressed tone deafness in adults as correctable with training.

=== Acquired amusia ===
Acquired amusia is a musical disability that shares the same characteristics as congenital amusia, but rather than being inherited, it is the result of brain damage. It is also more common than congenital amusia. While it has been suggested that music is processed by music-specific neural networks in the brain, this view has been broadened to show that music processing also encompasses generic cognitive functions, such as memory, attention, and executive processes. A study was published in 2009 which investigated the neural and cognitive mechanisms that underlie acquired amusia and contribute to its recovery. The study was performed on 53 stroke patients with a left or right hemisphere middle cerebral artery (MCA) infarction one week, three months, and six months after the stroke occurred. Amusic subjects were identified one week following their stroke, and over the course of the study, amusics and non-amusics were compared in both brain lesion location and their performances on neuropsychological tests.

Results showed that there was no significant difference in the distribution of left and right hemisphere lesions between amusic and non-amusic groups, but that the amusic group had a significantly higher number of lesions to the frontal lobe and auditory cortex. Temporal lobe lesions were also observed in patients with amusia. Amusia is a common occurrence following an ischemic MCA stroke, as evidenced by the 60% of patients who were found to be amusic at the one-week post-stroke stage. While significant recovery takes place over time, amusia can persist for long periods of time. Test results suggest that acquired amusia and its recovery in the post-stroke stage are associated with a variety of cognitive functions, particularly attention, executive functioning and working memory.

== Neuroanatomy ==
Neurologically intact individuals appear to be born musical. Even before they are able to talk, infants show remarkable musical abilities that are similar to those of adults in that they are sensitive to musical scales and a regular tempo. Also, infants are able to differentiate between consonant and dissonant intervals. These perceptual skills indicate that music-specific predispositions exist.

Prolonged exposure to music develops and refines these skills. Extensive musical training does not seem to be necessary in the processing of chords and keys. The development of musical competence most likely depends on the encoding of pitch along musical scales and maintaining a regular pulse, both of which are key components in the structure of music and aid in perception, memory, and performance. Also, the encoding of pitch and temporal regularity are both likely to be specialized for music processing. Pitch perception is absolutely crucial to processing music. The use of scales and the organization of scale tones around a central tone (called the tonic) assign particular importance to notes in the scale and cause non-scale notes to sound out of place. This enables the listener to ascertain when a wrong note is played. However, in individuals with amusia, this ability is either compromised or lost entirely.

Music-specific neural networks exist in the brain for a variety of music-related tasks. It has been shown that Broca's area is involved in the processing of musical syntax. Furthermore, brain damage can disrupt an individual's ability to tell the difference between tonal and atonal music and detect the presence of wrong notes, but can preserve the individual's ability to assess the distance between pitches and the direction of the pitch. The opposite scenario can also occur, in which the individual loses pitch discrimination capabilities, but can sense and appreciate the tonal context of the work. Distinct neural networks also exist for music memories, singing, and music recognition. Neural networks for music recognition are particularly intriguing. A patient can undergo brain damage that renders them unable to recognize familiar melodies that are presented without words. However, the patient maintains the ability to recognize spoken lyrics or words, familiar voices, and environmental sounds. The reverse case is also possible, in which the patient cannot recognize spoken words, but can still recognize familiar melodies. These situations overturn previous claims that speech recognition and music recognition share a single processing system. Instead, it is clear that there are at least two distinct processing modules: one for speech and one for music.

Many research studies of individuals with amusia show that a number of cortical regions appear to be involved in processing music. Some report that the primary auditory cortex, secondary auditory cortex, and limbic system are responsible for this faculty, while more recent studies suggest that lesions in other cortical areas, abnormalities in cortical thickness, and deficiency in neural connectivity and brain plasticity may contribute to amusia. While various causes of amusia exist, some general findings that provide insight to the brain mechanisms involved in music processing are discussed below.

=== Pitch relations ===
Studies suggest that the analysis of pitch is primarily controlled by the right temporal region of the brain. The right secondary auditory cortex processes pitch change and manipulation of fine tunes; specifically, this region distinguishes the multiple pitches that characterize melodic tunes as contour (pitch direction) and interval (frequency ratio between successive notes) information. The right superior temporal gyrus recruits and evaluates contour information, while both right and left temporal regions recruit and evaluate interval information. In addition, the right anterolateral part of Heschl's gyrus (primary auditory cortex) is also concerned with processing pitch information.

=== Temporal relations ===
The brain analyzes the temporal (rhythmic) components of music in two ways: (1) it segments the ongoing sequences of music into temporal events based on duration, and (2) it groups those temporal events to understand the underlying beat to music. Studies on rhythmic discrimination reveal that the right temporal auditory cortex is responsible for temporal segmenting, and the left temporal auditory cortex is responsible for temporal grouping. Other studies suggest the participation of motor cortical areas in rhythm perception and production. Therefore, a lack of involvement and networking between bilateral temporal cortices and neural motor centers may contribute to both congenital and acquired amusia.

=== Memory ===
Memory is required in order to process and integrate both melodic and rhythmic aspects of music. Studies suggest that there is a rich interconnection between the right temporal gyrus and frontal cortical areas for working memory in music appreciation. This connection between the temporal and frontal regions of the brain is extremely important since these regions play critical roles in music processing. Changes in the temporal areas of the amusic brain are most likely associated with deficits in pitch perception and other musical characteristics, while changes in the frontal areas are potentially related to deficits in cognitive processing aspects, such as memory, that are needed for musical discrimination tasks. Memory is also concerned with the recognition and internal representation of tunes, which help to identify familiar songs and confer the ability to sing tunes in one's head. The activation of the superior temporal region and left inferior temporal and frontal areas is responsible for the recognition of familiar songs, and the right auditory cortex (a perceptual mechanism) is involved in the internal representation of tunes. These findings suggest that any abnormalities and/or injuries to these regions of the brain could facilitate amusia.

=== Other regions of the brain possibly linked to amusia ===
- Lesions in (or the absence of) associations between the right temporal lobe and inferior frontal lobe. In nine of ten tone-deaf people, the superior arcuate fasciculus in the right hemisphere could not be detected, suggesting a disconnection between the posterior superior temporal gyrus and the posterior inferior frontal gyrus. Researchers suggested the posterior superior temporal gyrus was the origin of the disorder.
- Cortical thickness and reduced white matter – in a recent study, voxel-based morphometry, an imaging technique used to explore structural differences in the brain, revealed a decrease in white matter concentration in the right inferior frontal gyrus of amusic individuals as compared to controls. Lack of extensive exposure to music could be a contributing factor to this white matter reduction. For example, amusic individuals may be less inclined to listen to music than others, which could ultimately cause reduced myelination of connections to the frontal areas of the brain.
- Involvement of the parahippocampal gyrus (responsible for the emotional reaction to music)

== Treatment ==
Currently, no forms of treatment have proven effective in treating amusia. One study has shown tone differentiation techniques to have some success; however, future research on treatment of this disorder will be necessary to verify this technique as an appropriate treatment.

== History ==
In 1825, Franz Joseph Gall mentioned a "musical organ" in a specific region of the human brain that could be spared or disrupted after a traumatic event resulting in brain damage. In 1865, Jean-Baptiste Bouillaud described the first series of cases that involved the loss of music abilities that were due to brain injury. In 1878, Grant Allen was the first to describe in the medical literature what would later be termed congenital amusia, calling it "note-deafness". Later, during the late nineteenth century, several influential neurologists studied language in an attempt to construct a theory of cognition. While not studied as thoroughly as language, music and visual processing were also studied. In 1888–1890, August Knoblauch produced a cognitive model for music processing and termed it amusia. This model for music processing was the earliest produced.

While the possibility that certain individuals may be born with musical deficits is not a new notion, the first documented case of congenital amusia was published only in 2002. The study was conducted with a female volunteer, referred to as Monica, who declared herself to be musically impaired in response to an advertisement in the newspaper. Monica had no psychiatric or neurological history, nor did she have any hearing loss. MRI scans showed no abnormalities. Monica also scored above average on a standard intelligence test, and her working memory was evaluated and found to be normal. However, Monica had a lifelong inability to recognize or perceive music, which had persisted even after involvement with music through church choir and band during her childhood and teenage years. Monica said that she does not enjoy listening to music because, to her, it sounded like noise and evoked a stressful response.

In order to determine if Monica's disorder was amusia, she was subjected to the MBEA series of tests. One of the tests dealt with Monica's difficulties in discriminating pitch variations in sequential notes. In this test, a pair of melodies was played, and Monica was asked if the second melody in the pair contained a wrong note. Monica's score on this test was well below the average score generated by the control group. Further tests showed that Monica struggled with recognizing highly familiar melodies, but that she had no problems in recognizing the voices of well-known speakers. Thus, it was concluded that Monica's deficit seemed limited to music. A later study showed that not only do amusics experience difficulty in discriminating variations in pitch, but they also exhibit deficits in perceiving patterns in pitch.

This finding led to another test that was designed to assess the presence of a deficiency in pitch perception. In this test, Monica heard a sequence of five piano tones of constant pitch followed by a comparison sequence of five piano tones in which the fourth tone could be the same pitch as the other notes in the sequence or a completely different pitch altogether. Monica was asked to respond "yes" if she detected a pitch change on the fourth tone or respond "no" if she could not detect a pitch change. Results showed that Monica could barely detect a pitch change as large as two semitones (whole tone), or half steps. While this pitch-processing deficit is extremely severe, it does not seem to include speech intonation. This is because pitch variations in speech are very coarse compared with those used in music. In conclusion, Monica's learning disability arose from a basic problem in pitch discrimination, which is viewed as the origin of congenital amusia.

== Research ==
Since the early 2010s, much has been discovered about amusia. However, there remains a great deal more to learn. While a method of treatment for people with amusia has not been defined, tone differentiation techniques have been used on amusic patients with some success. It was found with this research that children reacted positively to these tone differentiation techniques, while adults found the training annoying. However, further research in this direction would aid in determining if this would be a viable treatment option for people with amusia. Additional research can also serve to indicate which processing component in the brain is essential for normal music development. Also, it would be extremely beneficial to investigate musical learning in relation to amusia since this could provide valuable insights into other forms of learning disabilities such as dysphasia and dyslexia.

== Notable cases ==
- Alfonso XIII of Spain
- Franz Boas
- William Lawrence Bragg
- Alfred Duff Cooper
- Charles Darwin
- John Dewey
- Pope Francis
- Ulysses S. Grant
- Che Guevara
- J. B. S. Haldane
- W. D. Hamilton
- Prince Henry, Duke of Gloucester
- Isabel Paterson
- Theodore Roosevelt
- William Butler Yeats

== In fiction ==
- Horatio Hornblower
- Trilby O'Ferrall from Trilby
- Grace from Home on the Range
- James Fraser from Outlander by Diana Gabaldon
- Rodrigo De Souza from Mozart in the Jungle
- Verity Auger and Susan White in Century Rain
- Arima Kousei from Your Lie in April
- Regulus from Reverse: 1999

== See also ==
- Absolute pitch, the human ability to name a musical note when played or sung (less common than relative pitch)
- Auditory agnosia
- Cognitive neuroscience of music
- Musical aptitude
- Music-specific disorders
- Relative pitch, the human ability to accurately distinguish pitch intervals (more common than absolute pitch)
- Synesthesia
- Tonal memory
