= Shepard tone =

Auditory illusion

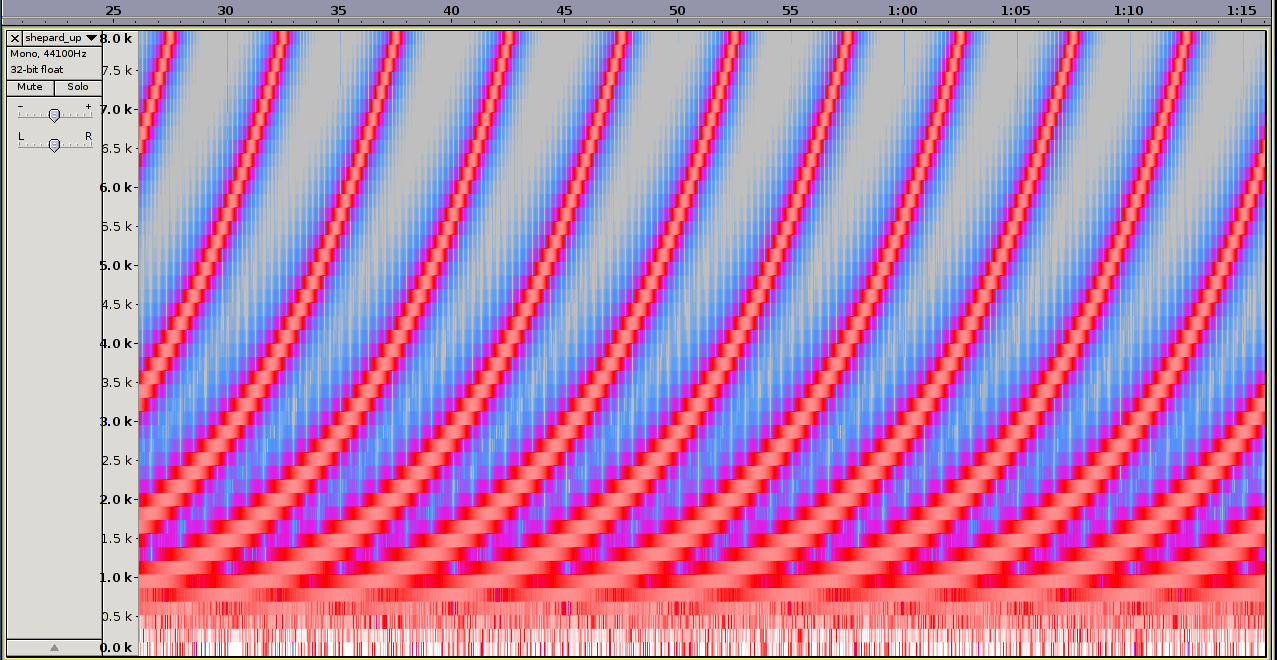
A spectrogram of ascending Shepard tones on a linear frequency scale

A Shepard tone, named after Roger Shepard, is a sound consisting of a superposition of sine waves separated by octaves. When played with the bass pitch of the tone moving upward or downward, it is referred to as the Shepard scale. This creates the auditory illusion of a tone that seems to continually ascend or descend in pitch, yet which ultimately gets no higher or lower.

== Construction ==
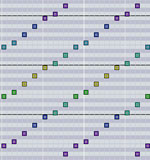
Figure 1: Shepard tones forming a Shepard scale, illustrated in a sequencer

Each square in Figure 1 indicates a tone, with any set of squares in vertical alignment together making one Shepard tone. The color of each square indicates the loudness of the note, with purple being the quietest and green the loudest. Overlapping notes that play at the same time are exactly one octave apart, and each scale fades in and fades out so that hearing the beginning or end of any given scale is impossible.

Shepard tone as of the root note A (A_{4} = 440 Hz)

Shepard scale, diatonic in C Major, repeated 5 times

As a conceptual example of an ascending Shepard scale, the first tone could be an almost inaudible C_{4} (middle C) and a loud C_{5} (an octave higher). The next would be a slightly louder C♯_{4} and a slightly quieter C♯_{5}; the next would be a still louder D_{4} and a still quieter D_{5}. The two frequencies would be equally loud at the middle of the octave (F♯_{4} and F♯_{5}), and the twelfth tone would be a loud B_{4} and an almost inaudible B_{5} with the addition of an almost inaudible B_{3}. The thirteenth tone would then be the same as the first, and the cycle could continue indefinitely. (In other words, each tone consists of two sine waves with frequencies separated by octaves; the intensity of each is e.g. a raised cosine function of its separation in semitones from a peak frequency, which in the above example would be B_{4}. According to Shepard, "almost any smooth distribution that tapers off to subthreshold levels at low and high frequencies would have done as well as the cosine curve actually employed."

The theory behind the illusion was demonstrated during an episode of the BBC's show Bang Goes the Theory, where the effect was described as "a musical barber's pole".

The scale as described, with discrete steps between each tone, is known as the discrete Shepard scale. The illusion is more convincing if there is a short time between successive notes (staccato or marcato rather than legato or portamento).

== Variants ==
Moving audio and video visualization of a rising Shepard–Risset glissando. See and hear the higher tones as they fade out.

=== Shepard–Risset glissando ===
Jean-Claude Risset subsequently created a version of the scale where the tones glide continuously, and it is appropriately called the continuous Risset scale or Shepard–Risset glissando. When done correctly, the tone appears to rise (or fall) continuously in pitch, yet return to its starting note. Risset has also created a similar effect with rhythm in which tempo seems to increase or decrease endlessly.

An example of Risset's accelerating rhythm effect using a breakbeat loop

=== Tritone paradox ===
A sequentially played pair of Shepard tones separated by an interval of a tritone (half an octave) produces the tritone paradox. Shepard had predicted that the two tones would constitute a bistable figure, the auditory equivalent of the Necker cube, that could be heard ascending or descending, but never both at the same time.

Sequence of Shepard tones producing the tritone paradox

In 1986, Diana Deutsch discovered that the perception of which tone was higher depended on the absolute frequencies involved and that an individual would usually hear the same pitch as the highest (this is determined by the absolute pitch of the notes). Different listeners may perceive the same pattern as being either ascending or descending, depending on the language or dialect of the listener (Deutsch, Henthorn, and Dolson found that native speakers of Vietnamese, a tonal language, heard the tritone paradox differently from Californians who were native speakers of English).

=== Perpetual melody ===
Pedro Patricio observed in 2012 that, by using a Shepard tone as a sound source and applying it to a melody, he could reproduce the illusion of a continuously ascending or descending movement characteristic of the Shepard Scale. Regardless of the tempo and the envelope of the notes, the auditory illusion is effectively maintained. The uncertainty of the scale to which the Shepard tones pertain allows composers to experiment with deceiving and disconcerting melodies.

An example of an ascendent perpetual melody

== Examples ==
- James Tenney's For Ann (rising) consists entirely of a Shepard tone glissando with gradual modulations.
- A section near the end of Karlheinz Stockhausen's Hymnen incorporates multiple descending Shepard tone glissandos.
- The ending of The Beatles' "I Am the Walrus" incorporates a Shepard tone with a chord progression built on ascending and descending lines in the bass and strings that line up to create the auditory illusion.
- The ending of Pink Floyd's "Echoes" from their 1971 album Meddle features an ascending Shepard tone created using a feedback technique involving two tape recorders sharing a single tape, with one set to play and the other to record.
- In his 1979 book Gödel, Escher, Bach: An Eternal Golden Braid, Douglas Hofstadter explained how Shepard scales could be used on the Canon a 2, per tonos in Bach's Musical Offering (called the Endlessly Rising Canon by Hofstadter) for making the modulation end in the same pitch instead of an octave higher.
- On Yellow Magic Orchestra's 1981 electronic album BGM, the ambient track "Loom" has "a patiently ascending, two-minute-long" Shepard tone according to Pitchfork.
- The Deep Note sound trademark of THX, introduced in 1983, uses a Shepard tone in its opening section.
- In 1995, Ira Braus argued that the final sequence of Franz Liszt's 1885 piano piece Bagatelle sans tonalité could be continued to produce a Shepard scale using Hofstadter's technique.
- In a 1967 AT&T film by Shepard and E. E. Zajac, a Shepard tone accompanies the ascent of an analogous Penrose stair.
- In the video game Super Mario 64 (1996) for the Nintendo 64 console, a piece that plays when the player tries to climb the neverending stairs (before reaching 70 stars) located in the penultimate room of Peach's Castle incorporates a slightly modified Shepard scale played in the background. This auditory illusion complements the spatial loop effect, seemingly giving the impression that the stairs never end.
- Austrian composer Georg Friedrich Haas incorporates Shepard tones at various points in his orchestral piece in vain (2000/02).
- Christopher Nolan said in an interview that the soundtrack of his 2006 film The Prestige (composed by David Julyan) explores the potential of Shepard tones as a fundamental basis for compositions. This is fully realised in his 2017 film Dunkirk where a Shepard tone is used to create the illusion of an ever increasing moment of intensity across intertwined storylines.
- In Stephin Merritt's 2007 song "Man of a Million Faces", composed for NPR's "Project Song", the Shepard tone is a key aspect.
- In the 2008 film The Dark Knight and its 2012 followup The Dark Knight Rises, a Shepard tone was used to create the sound of the Batpod, a motorcycle that the filmmakers did not want to change gear and tone abruptly but to accelerate constantly.
- In Lucrecia Martel's feature film Zama (2017), there is extensive use of the Shepard tone creating a "loud and shreechy soundscape, in order to achieve closeness to the viewer", according to the director.
- The 2018 track "Always Ascending" by Franz Ferdinand from the album of the same name features a rising Shepard tone throughout the song. The video for the song echoes the effect, with the camera apparently rising continually throughout.
- The technique was used in Christopher Nolan's 2026 film The Odyssey. Composer Ludwig Göransson incorporated a continuously accelerating Risset rhythm into the score, which Nolan described as the rhythmic equivalent of a Shepard tone. The technique is used repeatedly in the film, including during the sacking of Troy and the climactic sequence in which Odysseus attacks the suitors. Nolan said the accelerating rhythm was intended to heighten anxiety and tension and create the sensation of being pursued. Göransson's use of the technique continued an approach Nolan and composer Hans Zimmer had developed for Dunkirk.

== See also ==
- Chorus (audio effect)
- Deep Note
- Flanging
- Interference (wave propagation)
- Phaser (effect)
- Pitch circularity
- Sound effect
- Strange loop
