= Deutsch's scale illusion =

Auditory illusion

Sound sample
The above example, played first a channel at a time, then simultaneously. The full illusion, as originally developed by Deutsch, is linked below.

Deutsch's scale illusion is an auditory illusion in which two series of unconnected notes appear to combine into a single recognisable melody, when played simultaneously into the left and right ears of a listener.

The illusion is produced by simultaneous ascending and descending major scales beginning in separate stereo channels with each successive note being switched to the opposite channel: the left channel plays C'-D-A-F-F-A-D-C' while the right channel plays C-B-E-G-G-E-B-C; the melodies heard are C'-B-A-G-G-A-B-C' and C-D-E-F-F-E-D-C. The tones are equal-amplitude sine waves, and the sequence is played repeatedly without pause at a rate of four tones per second.

When listening to the illusion over headphones, most right-handers hear a melody corresponding to the higher tones as on the right and a melody corresponding to the lower tones as on the left. When the earphone positions are reversed, the higher tones continue to appear to be coming from the right and the lower tones from the left. Other people experience different illusions, such as the higher tones on the left and the lower tones on the right, or a pattern in which the sounds appear to be localized in different and changing ways. Right-handers and left-handers differ statistically in how the scale illusion is perceived.

The effect was discovered by Diana Deutsch in 1973. In a clinical study, patients with hemispatial neglect were shown to experience the scale illusion. Further, in an MEG study on normal listeners the scale illusion was found to be neurally represented at or near the auditory cortex.
