= Octave illusion =

Auditory illusion involving alternating octave tones

Octave illusion
The octave illusion: two pitches at 400 and 800 Hz, played in each ear, alternating ears every 250 milliseconds, for 10 seconds

The octave illusion is an auditory illusion discovered by Diana Deutsch in 1973. It is produced when two tones that are an octave apart are repeatedly played in alternation ("high-low-high-low") through stereo headphones. The same sequence is played to both ears simultaneously; however, when the right ear receives the high tone, the left ear receives the low tone, and conversely. Instead of hearing two alternating pitches, most subjects instead hear a single tone that alternates between ears while at the same time its pitch alternates between high and low.

== First experiment ==
The two tones used were pitched at 400 Hz and 800 Hz, corresponding roughly to G4 and G5 in modern pitch notation. Each tone was played for 250 ms before switching ears. No gaps were allowed between tones. Both tones were therefore always present during the experiment; only the ears perceiving the high and the low tone at any one time changed repeatedly. After the initial test, the headphones were reversed, and the test was repeated.

== Results ==
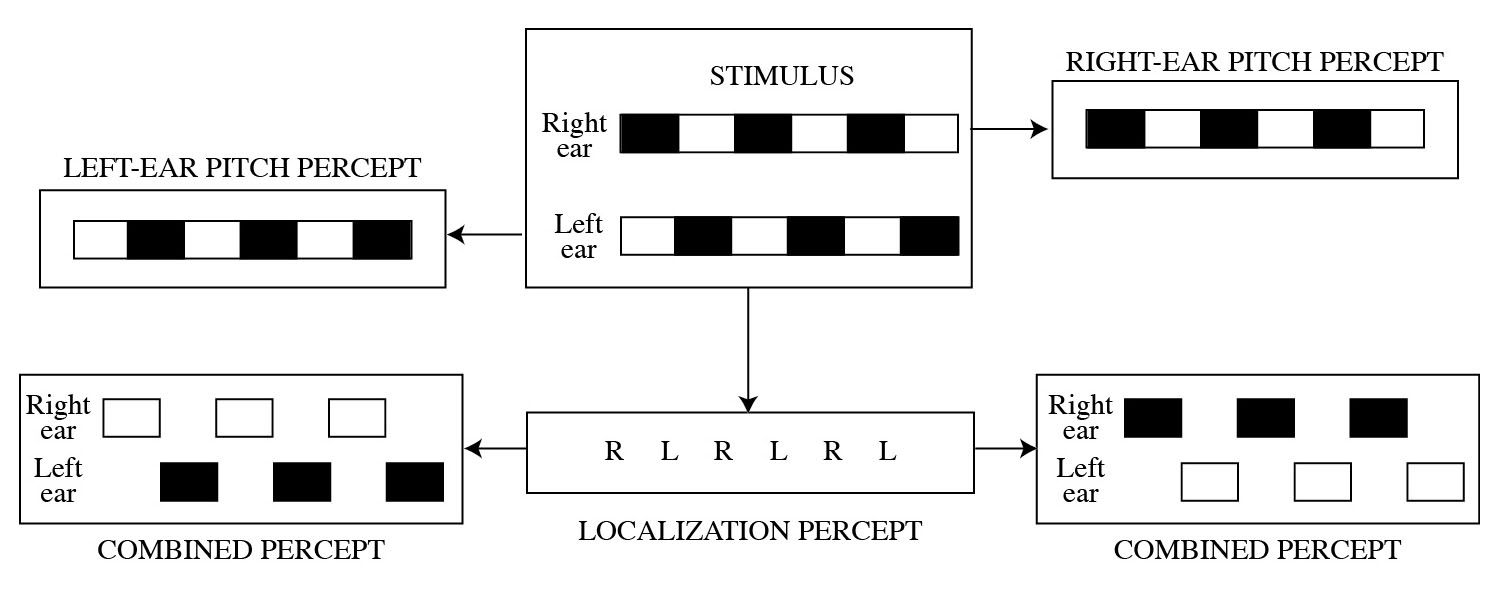
Model of the octave illusion in terms of separate "what" and "where" decision mechanisms

86 subjects were tested, and none perceived the tonal pattern correctly. Most subjects heard a single tone that alternated in pitch by an octave as it alternated between ears. When the earphones were reversed, the ear that initially heard the high tone continued to hear the high tone, and the ear that initially heard the low tone continued to hear the low tone. Some subjects only heard a single tone that moved between ears but did not change in pitch, or changed very slightly. Several subjects heard various "complex" illusions, such as two alternating pitches in one ear and a third pitch that sporadically occurred in the other ear.

Handedness also played an important role in the results. 58% of right-handed subjects and 52% of left-handed subjects heard a single pitch that switched between octaves as it switched between ears. Of the remaining subjects, nearly three times as many right-handers than left-handers heard a tone that switched ears but not pitch. Left-handed subjects were varied in their localization of the high and low tones, while right-handed subjects were much more likely to hear the high tone localized to their right ear during both tests.

Deutsch proposed that when a single tone that alternates between octaves is heard, this illusion results from the combined operation of two decision mechanisms. First, to determine the tone's location, high pitches are given precedence; second, to determine the tone's pitch, tones in the dominant ear are given precedence over tones in the non-dominant ear. This is known as the two-channel model, since it is proposed that the operation of two separate "what" and "where" decision mechanisms combine to produce the illusion. The model is illustrated here.

== Further experiments ==
In a further experiment, Deutsch examined the effect of handedness and familial handedness background on perception of the octave illusion. The subjects were 250 students, who were classified both according to their handedness and also according to whether they had a left-handed parent or sibling. It was found that right-handers were more likely to hear the high tone on the right (and the low tone on the left) than were mixed-handers, and mixed-handers were more likely to do so than left-handers. And for all three handedness groups the tendency to hear the high tone on the right was greater for subjects with only right-handed parents and siblings than for those with left- or mixed-handed parents or siblings.

In another experiment, Deutsch and Roll explored the two-channel model in further detail. They played 44 right-handed subjects a repeating pattern of tones pitched at 400 Hz and 800 Hz. This time the right ear was given three 800 Hz pitches alternating with two 400 Hz pitches, while the left ear simultaneously heard three 400 Hz pitches alternating with two 800 Hz pitches. A 250 ms pause was added between each successive tone combination. Subjects were asked to report how many high tones and how many low tones they heard, and in which ears they heard the tones. The results were consistent with the initial experiment.

In further experiments based on the same model Deutsch asked subjects to report whether the pattern was of the "high-low-high-low" type or the "low-high-low-high" type. From this it could be determined which ear the subject was following for pitch. The amplitude of the unheard pitch was then manipulated in order to determine how large it needed to be, in order to counteract the effect, and it was found that a significant amplitude disparity was sometimes needed. It was also determined that, when both tones were not present at the same time, the illusion was broken.

In yet other experiments, Deutsch varied the relative amplitudes of the high and low tones and asked subjects whether the pattern was of the "right-left-right-left-" type or the "left-right-left-right" type. From this it could be determined whether the subject was localizing the tone to the high or low pitch. Again, it was found that a large amplitude disparity was sometimes needed to counteract the effect.

== "Deutsch illusion" ==
Brancucci, Padulo, and Tommasi argue that the octave illusion should be renamed the "Deutsch illusion", since, according to their findings, the illusion is not limited to the octave. They performed an experiment similar to Deutsch's original, except the two tones that were used ranged in interval from a minor third to an eleventh. The tones were presented initially for 200 ms before switching ears, then again for 500 ms. While the illusion was present for several people at all intervals, the illusion occurred more often with wider intervals.

== Criticism and rebuttal ==
Chambers, Moss, and Mattingley believe that the illusion is caused by a combination of harmonic fusion and binaural diplacusis, a condition in which a pitch is perceived slightly differently between ears. In experiments employing a few subjects, none reported the percept most commonly obtained by Deutsch's subjects. This does not necessarily conflict with other studies, as the number of subjects used in this experiment was small and there are individual differences in perception of the illusion. The authors also argued that experiments conducted by others did not clarify whether the high tone and low tones were perceived as being an octave apart. They claimed, therefore, that their results were not consistent with those of Deutsch in relation to hand dominance and ear dominance versus location of pitch.

These criticisms were rebutted in two articles. Deutsch (2004a) used a new procedure, which provided more explicit documentation of the octave illusion; here musically trained subjects notated precisely what they heard. The experiment confirmed that subjects, on listening to the illusion, perceive an octave difference between the ears. This result cannot be explained by diplacusis, which refers to a difference of a fraction of a semitone between the ears. The article also documented that Chambers et al. used problematic procedures. In a further article, Deutsch (2004b) showed that Chambers et al. made inappropriate comparisons with other phenomena of sound perception, and failed to consider several key findings that support Deutsch's model. In addition, the octave illusion, in which an octave difference between the ears is perceived, has been replicated in several other laboratories. For example, Oehler and Reuter recently replicated the handedness correlate in a study of 174 subjects Lamminmaki and Hari (2000) and Lamminmaki et al. (2012) in MEG studies provide an explanation of the illusion at the neurophysiological level that is in accordance with Deutsch's two-channel model.
