= Psychology, philosophy and physiology =

Psychology, philosophy and physiology (PPP) was a degree program at the University of Oxford. It was Oxford's first psychology degree, beginning in 1947, but admitted its last students in October 2010. It has been, in part, replaced by psychology, philosophy, and linguistics (PPL, in which students usually study two of three subjects).

PPP covered the study of thought and behaviour from the differing points of view of psychology, physiology and philosophy. Psychology includes social interaction, learning, child development, mental illness and information processing. Physiology considers the organization of the brain and body of mammals and humans, from the molecular level to the organism as a whole. Philosophy is concerned with ethics, knowledge, the mind, etc.
