= Jean-Claude Risset =

French composer

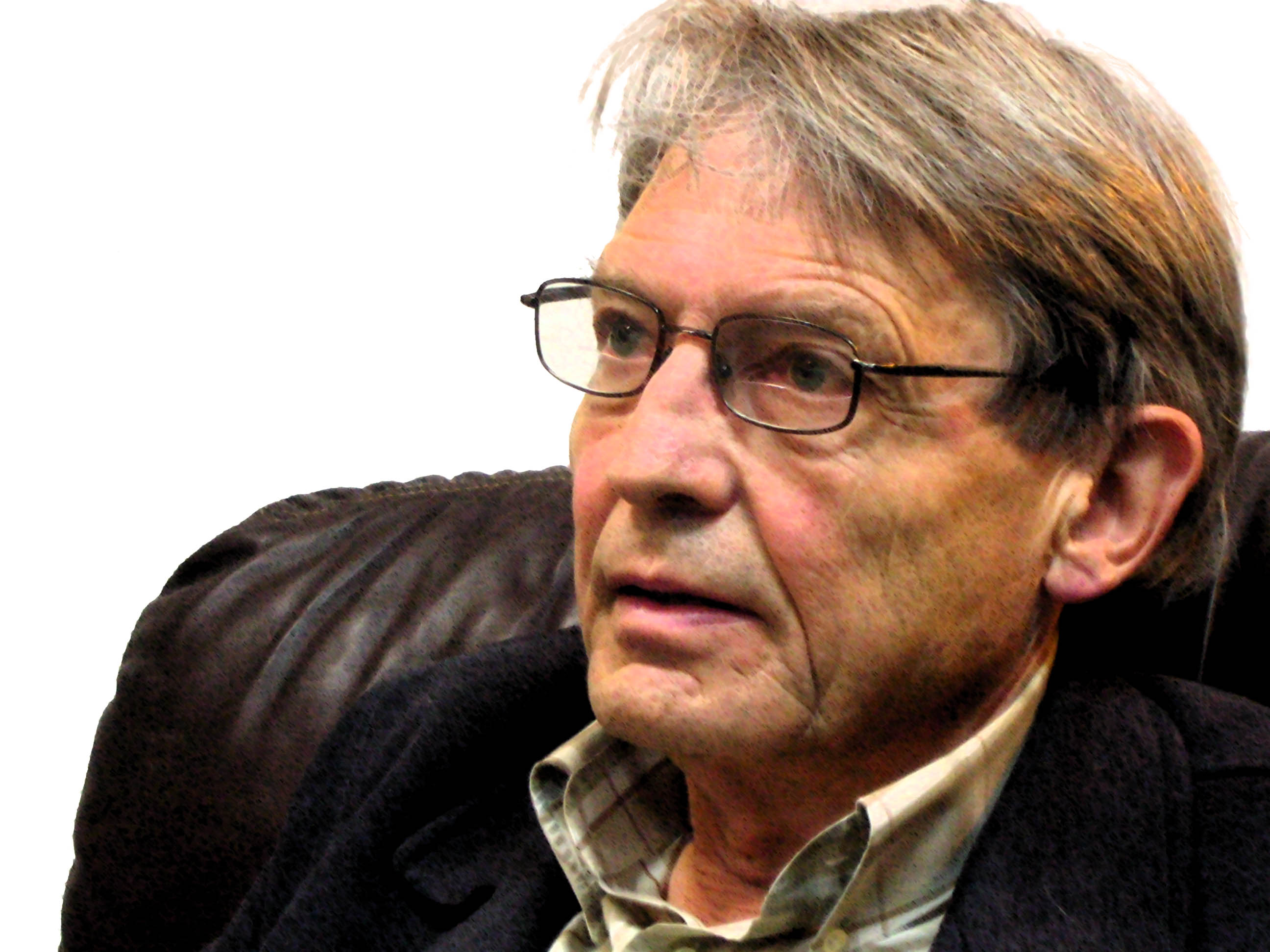
- Risset in 2008
- Born: Jean-Claude Raoul Olivier Risset; 13 March 1938; Le Puy-en-Velay, Rhone-Alpes region, France
- Died: 21 November 2016 (aged 78); Marseille, France
- Education: École Normale Supérieure, Music theory (1961)
- Years active: 1961-2011
- Employer: Nokia Bell Labs
- Known for: Computer Music

Jean-Claude Raoul Olivier Risset (French: [ʁisɛ]; 13 March 1938 – 21 November 2016) was a French composer, best known for his pioneering contributions to computer music. He was a former student of André Jolivet and former co-worker of Max Mathews at Bell Labs.

== Biography ==
Risset was born in Le Puy-en-Velay, France. Arriving at Bell Labs, New Jersey in 1964, he used Max Mathews' MUSIC IV software to digitally recreate the sounds of brass instruments. He made digital recordings of trumpets and studied their timbral composition using "pitch-synchronous" spectrum analysis tools, revealing that the amplitude and frequency of the harmonics (more correctly, partials) of these instruments would differ depending on frequency, duration and amplitude. He is also credited with performing the first experiments on a range of synthesis techniques including FM synthesis and waveshaping.

After the discrete Shepard scale Risset created a version of the scale where the steps between each tone are continuous, and it is appropriately called the continuous Risset scale or Shepard-Risset glissando.

A Shepard-Risset glissando

Risset's rhythmic effect – a breakbeat that accelerates forever

Risset also created a similar effect with rhythm in which tempo seems to increase or decrease endlessly. Risset was the head of the Computer Department at IRCAM (1975–1979). At MIT Media Labs, he composed the first Duet for one pianist (1989). For his work in computer music and his 70 compositions, he received the first Golden Nica (Ars Electronica Prize, 1987), the Giga-Hertz Grand Prize 2009, and the highest French awards in both music (Grand Prix National de la Musique, 1990) and science (Gold Medal, Centre National de la Recherche Scientifique, 1999). and in art (René Dumesnil Prize from the French Academy of Fine Arts, 2011).

Risset died in Marseille on 21 November 2016.

== Selected works ==
Vocal music

- Dérives, for choir and magnetic tape (1985) 15'
- Inharmonique, for soprano and tape (1977) 15'

Orchestral music

- Escalas, for large orchestra (2001) 17'
- Mirages, for 16 musicians and tape (1978) 24'

Chamber music

- Profils, for 7 instruments and tape (1983) 18'
- Mutations II for ensemble and electronics (1973) 17'

Solo music

- Trois études en duo, for pianist (bidirectional MIDI piano with computer interaction) (1991) 10'
- Huit esquisses en duo, for pianist (bidirectional MIDI piano with computer interaction) (1989) 17'
- Voilements, for saxophone and tape (1987) 14'
- Passages for flute and tape (1982) 14'
- Variants for violin and digital processing (1995) 8'

Music for solo tape

- Invisible Irène (1995) 12'
- Sud (1985) 24'
- Songes (1979) 10'
- Trois mouvements newtoniens, for tape (1978) 13'
- Mutations (1969) 10'
- Computer Suite from Little Boy (1968) 13'
