= Robert Shannon =

Robert Shannon may refer to:

- Robert Shannon (boxer) (born 1962), American boxer
- Rab Shannon (born 1966), Scottish footballer
- Robert D. Shannon, American chemist
- Robert R. Shannon, professor of optical sciences
- Robert T. Shannon (1895–1950), American screenwriter and novelist
- Robert V. Shannon, professor of otolaryngology

== See also ==
- Bob Shannon (disambiguation)
