= August Seebeck =

German physicist

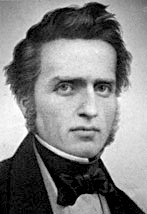

August Ludwig Friedrich Wilhelm Seebeck (27 December 1805 in Jena – 19 March 1849 in Dresden) was a scientist at the Technische Universität Dresden.

Seebeck is primarily remembered for his work on sound and hearing, in particular with experiments with an acoustic siren that demonstrated that the pitch of a tone did not depend on the tone having a fundamental frequency component of the pitch frequency. His observations and theories are now highly regarded, but historically suffered in the battle with Ohm and Helmholtz, who took a Fourier analysis view of the sound of tones.

Wodurch kann über die Frage, was zu einem Tone gehöre, entschieden werden, als eben durch das Ohr? (How else can the question as to what makes out a tone be decided but by the ear?)

— August Seebeck 1844

With respect to Ohm's acoustic law, historians have concluded that Seebeck "successfully discredited the hypothesis and forced Ohm to withdraw from the field". Ohm was actually correct, but at that time both he and his opponent lacked the understanding required to prove this, which had to wait for Hermann von Helmholtz.

== See also ==
- Auditory science
- Sound localization
- Temporal theory (hearing)
