= Place theory =

Theory about mechanism of hearing

Place theory is a theory of hearing that states that our perception of sound depends on where each component frequency produces vibrations along the basilar membrane. By this theory, the pitch of a sound, such as a human voice or a musical tone, is determined by the places where the membrane vibrates, based on frequencies corresponding to the tonotopic organization of the primary auditory neurons.

More generally, schemes that base attributes of auditory perception on the neural firing rate as a function of place are known as rate–place schemes.

The main alternative to the place theory is the temporal theory, also known as timing theory. These theories are closely linked with the volley principle or volley theory, a mechanism by which groups of neurons can encode the timing of a sound waveform. In all cases, neural firing patterns in time determine the perception of pitch. The combination known as the place–volley theory uses both mechanisms in combination, primarily coding low pitches by temporal pattern and high pitches by rate–place patterns. It is now generally believed that there is good evidence for both mechanisms.

The place theory is usually attributed to Hermann Helmholtz, though it was widely believed much earlier.

Experiments to distinguish between place theory and rate theory are difficult to devise, because of the strong correlation: large vibrations with low rate are produced at the apical end of the basilar membrane while large vibrations with high rate are produced at the basal end. The two can be controlled independently using cochlear implants: pulses with a range of rates can be applied via electrodes distributed along the membrane. Experiments using implant recipients showed that, at low stimulation rates, ratings of pitch on a pitch scale were proportional to the log of stimulation rate, but also decreased with distance from the round window. At higher rates, the effect of rate was weaker, but the effect of place was strong.
