= Deniz Başkent =

Turkish-born Dutch auditory scientist

- Born: Ankara, Turkey
- Education: PhD, University of Southern California, USA, 2003
- Scientific career
- Fields: Auditory sciences
- Institutions: University of Groningen, University Medical Center Groningen, Groningen, Netherlands
- Thesis: "Speech recognition under conditions of frequency-place compression and expansion" (2003)
- Website: dbspl.nl

Deniz Başkent is a Turkish-born Dutch auditory scientist who works on auditory perception. As of 2018, she is Professor of Audiology at the University Medical Center Groningen, Netherlands.

== Biography ==
Born and raised in Turkey, Başkent trained as an electrical engineer, obtaining undergraduate and MS degrees in electrical engineering (emphasis on robotics) at Bilkent University in Ankara. Başkent then moved to Los Angeles, CA, where she obtained a PhD in Biomedical engineering from the University of Southern California in 2003 for her work on "Speech recognition under conditions of frequency-place compression and expansion", under supervision of Robert V. Shannon at the House Ear Institute in Los Angeles, CA. She then obtained a NOHR Grant to fund a postdoc position in the same lab until the end of 2004. Moving from Los Angeles to the Bay Area, Başkent took a position as Research Scientist at the Starkey Research Center in Berkeley.

In 2009, Başkent moved to the Netherlands after obtaining a Rosalind Franklin Fellowship at the Department of Otorhinolaryngology of the University Medical Center Groningen. There, she founded the dB SPL (Deniz Başkent Speech Perception Lab) research group. Başkent received a Vidi grant from the Netherlands Organisation for Scientific Research in 2010, and a Vici grant from the same organisation in 2017. She was promoted full professor in 2014.

Başkent became a Fellow of the Acoustical Society of America in 2017.

== Research ==
Başkent's principal research area focuses on speech perception with cochlear implants and hearing impairment. Her approach is largely multidisciplinary, combining psychoacoustics, psycholinguistics and biomedical engineering. Between 2010 and 2016, she has published numerous studies on phonemic restoration and interrupted speech in listeners with hearing impairment.

More recently, her work has focused on voice, emotion and speaking style perception in cochlear implant users, development of voice and emotion perception in children with normal and impaired hearing, cognitive and neural mechanisms of normal and impaired hearing, and music training in cognitive rehabilitation.
