= Temporal theory (hearing) =

Theory of the mechanism of hearing

The temporal theory of hearing, also called frequency theory or timing theory, states that human perception of sound depends on temporal patterns with which neurons respond to sound in the cochlea. Therefore, in this theory, the pitch of a pure tone is determined by the period of neuron firing patterns—either of single neurons, or groups as described by the volley theory. Temporal theory competes with the place theory of hearing, which instead states that pitch is signaled according to the locations of vibrations along the basilar membrane.

Temporal theory was first suggested by August Seebeck.

== Description ==
As the basilar membrane vibrates, each clump of hair cells along its length is deflected in time with the sound components as filtered by basilar membrane tuning for its position. The more intense this vibration is, the more the hair cells are deflected and the more likely they are to cause cochlear nerve firings. Temporal theory supposes that the consistent timing patterns, whether at high or low average firing rate, code for a consistent pitch percept.

== High amplitudes ==
At high sounds levels, nerve fibers whose characteristic frequencies do not exactly match the stimulus still respond, because of the motion induced in larger areas of the basilar membrane by loud sounds. Temporal theory can help explain how we maintain this discrimination. Even when a larger group of nerve fibers are all firing, there is a periodicity to this firing, which corresponds to the periodicity of the stimulus.

== High frequencies ==
Neurons have a maximum firing frequency within the range of frequencies we can hear. To be complete, rate theory must somehow explain how we distinguish pitches above this maximum firing rate. The volley theory, in which groups of neurons cooperate to code the temporal pattern, is an attempt to make the temporal theory more complete, but some frequencies are too high to see any synchrony in the cochlear nerve firings.

=== The random firing solution ===
Beament outlined a potential solution. He noted that in two classic studies individual hair cell neurons did not always fire at the first moment they were able to. Though they would fire in time with the vibrations, the neurons would not fire on every vibration. The number of skipped vibrations was seemingly random. The gaps in the resulting train of neural impulses would then all be integer multiples of the period of vibration. For example, a pure tone of 100 Hz has a period of 10 ms. The corresponding train of impulses would contain gaps of 10 ms, 20 ms, 30 ms, 40 ms, etc. Such a group of gaps can only be generated by a 100 Hz tone. The set of gaps for a sound above the maximum neural firing rate would be similar except it would be missing some of the initial gaps, however it would still uniquely correspond to the frequency. The pitch of a pure tone could then be seen as corresponding to the difference between adjacent gaps.

=== Another solution ===
Research suggests that the perception of pitch depends on both the places and patterns of neuron firings. Place theory may be dominant for higher frequencies. However, it is also suggested that place theory may be dominant for low, resolved frequency harmonics, and that temporal theory may be dominant for high, unresolved frequency harmonics.

== Experiments to distinguish rate and place effects on pitch perception ==
Experiments to distinguish between place theory and rate theory using subjects with normal hearing are difficult to devise, because of the strong correlation between rate and place: large vibrations at a low rate are produced at the apical end of the basilar membrane while large vibrations at a high rate are produced at the basal end. The two stimulus parameters can, however, be controlled independently using cochlear implants: pulses with a range of rates can be applied via different pairs of electrodes distributed along the membrane and subjects can be asked to rate a stimulus on a pitch scale.

Experiments using implant recipients (who had previously had normal hearing) showed that, at stimulation rates below about 500 Hz, ratings on a pitch scale were proportional to the log of stimulation rate, but also decreased with distance from the round window. At higher rates, the effect of rate became weaker, but the effect of place was still strong.
