= Volley theory =

Theory of the mechanism of hearing

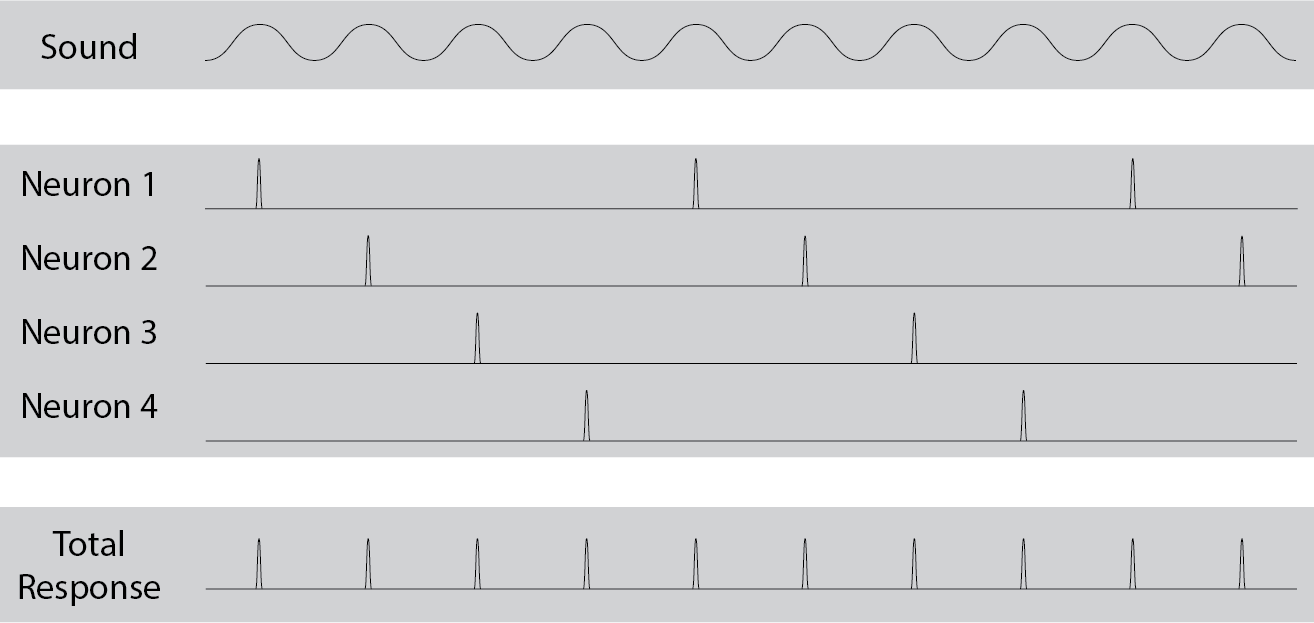
Volley Theory of Hearing demonstrated by four neurons firing at a phase-locked frequency to the sound stimulus. The total response corresponds with the stimulus.

Volley theory states that groups of neurons of the auditory system respond to a sound by firing action potentials slightly out of phase with one another so that when combined, a greater frequency of sound can be encoded and sent to the brain to be analyzed. The theory was proposed by Ernest Wever and Charles Bray in 1930 as a supplement to the frequency theory of hearing. It was later discovered that this only occurs in response to sounds ranging from about 500 Hz to 5000 Hz.

== Description ==
The volley theory was explained in depth in Ernest Wever's 1949 book, Theory of Hearing. Groups of neurons in the cochlea individually fire at subharmonic frequencies of a sound being heard and collectively phase-lock to match the total frequencies of the sound. The reason for this is that neurons can only fire at a maximum of about 500 Hz but other theories of hearing did not explain for hearing sounds below about 5000 Hz.

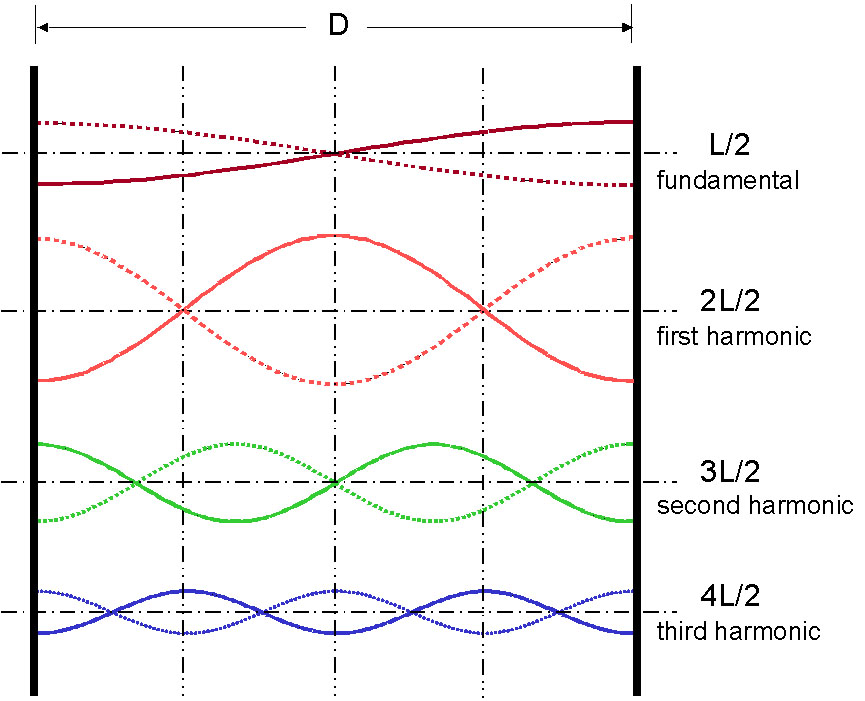
Harmonic waveform of a fundamental frequency L/2

=== Harmonic spectrums ===
Sounds are often sums of multiple frequency tones. When these frequencies are whole number multiples of a fundamental frequency they create a harmonic. When groups of auditory neurons are presented with harmonics, each neuron fires at one frequency and when combined, the entire harmonic is encoded into the primary auditory cortex of the brain. This is the basis of volley theory.

=== Phase-locking ===
Phase-locking is known as matching amplitude times to a certain phase of another waveform. In the case of auditory neurons, this means firing an action potential at a certain phase of a stimulus sound being delivered. It has been seen that when being played a pure tone, auditory nerve fibers will fire at the same frequency as the tone. Volley theory suggests that groups of auditory neurons use phase-locking to represent subharmonic frequencies of one harmonic sound. This has been shown in guinea pig and cat models.

In 1980, Don Johnson experimentally revealed phase-locking in the auditory nerve fibers of the adult cat. In the presence of -40 to -100 decibel single tones lasting 15 or 30 seconds, recordings from the auditory nerve fibers showed firing fluctuations in synchrony with the stimulus. Johnson observed that during frequencies below 1000 Hz, two peaks are recorded for every cycle of the stimulus, which had varying phases according to stimulation frequency. This phenomenon was interpreted as the result of a second harmonic, phase-locking to the stimulus waveform. However, at frequencies between about 1000 Hz and 5000 Hz, phase-locking becomes progressively inaccurate and intervals tend to become more random.

=== Pitch perception ===
Pitch is an assigned, perceptual property where a listener orders sound frequencies from low to high. Pitch is hypothesized to be determined by receiving phase-locked input from neuronal axons and combining that information into harmonics. In simple sounds consisting of one frequency, the pitch is equivalent to the frequency. There are two models of pitch perception; a spectral and a temporal. Low frequency sounds evoke the strongest pitches, suggesting that pitch is based on the temporal components of the sound. Historically, there have been many models of pitch perception. (Terhardt, 1974; Goldstein, 1973; Wightman, 1973). Many consisted of a peripheral spectral-analysis stage and a central periodicity-analysis stage. In his model, Terhardt claims that the spectral-analysis output of complex sounds, specifically low frequency ones, is a learned entity which eventually allows easy identification of the virtual pitch. The volley principle is predominantly seen during the pitch perception of lower frequencies where sounds are often resolved. Goldstein proposed that through phase-locking and temporal frequencies encoded in neuron firing rates, the brain has the itemization of frequencies that can then be used to estimate pitch.

== Discovery and history ==
Throughout the nineteenth century, many theories and concepts of hearing were created. Ernest Wever proposed the volley theory in 1937 with his paper "The Perception of Low Tones and the Resonance-Volley Theory". In this paper, Wever discusses previous theories of hearing and introduces volley theory using support from his own experiments and research. The theory was introduced as a supplement to the frequency theory or temporal theory of hearing, which was in contrast to the place theory of hearing.

Anatomy of Human Ear with Cochlear Frequency Mapping

=== Place theory ===
The most prominent figure in the creation of the place theory of hearing is Hermann von Helmholtz, who published his finished theory in 1885. Helmholtz claimed that the cochlea contained individual fibers for analyzing each pitch and delivering that information to the brain. Many followers revised and added to Helmholtz's theory and the consensus soon became that high frequency sounds were encoded near the base of the cochlea and that middle frequency sounds were encoded near the apex. Georg von Békésy developed a novel method of dissecting the inner ear and using stroboscopic illumination to observe the basilar membrane move, adding evidence to support the theory.

=== Frequency theory ===
Ideas related to the frequency theory of hearing came about in the late 1800s as a result of the research of many individuals. In 1865, Heinrich Adolf Rinne challenged the place theory; he claimed that it’s not very efficient for complex sounds to be broken into simple sounds then be reconstructed in the brain. Later, Friedrich Voltolini added on by proposing that every auditory hair cell is stimulated by any sound. Correspondingly, William Rutherford provided evidence that this hypothesis was true, allowing greater accuracy of the cochlea. In 1886, Rutherford also proposed that the brain interpreted the vibrations of the hair cells and that the cochlea did no frequency or pitch analysis of the sound. Soon after, Max Friedrich Meyer, among other ideas, theorized that nerves would be excited at the same frequency of the stimulus.

=== Volley theory ===
Of the various theories and notions created by Rinne, Rutherford, and their followers, the frequency theory was born. In general, it claimed that all sounds were encoded to the brain by neurons firing at a rate that mimics the frequency of the sound. However, because humans can hear frequencies up to 20,000 Hz but neurons cannot fire at these rates, the frequency theory had a major flaw. In an effort to combat this fault, Ernest Wever and Charles Bray, in 1930, proposed the volley theory, claiming that multiple neurons could fire in a volley to later combine and equal the frequency of the original sound stimulus. Through more research, it was determined that because phase synchrony is only accurate up to about 1000 Hz, volley theory cannot account for all frequencies at which we hear.

=== Present thoughts ===
Ultimately, as new methods of studying the inner ear came about, a combination of place theory and frequency theory was adopted. Today, it is widely believed that hearing follows the rules of the frequency theory, including volley theory, at frequencies below 1000 Hz and place theory at frequencies above 5000 Hz. For sounds with frequencies between 1000 and 5000 Hz, both theories come into play so the brain can utilize the basilar membrane location and the rate of the impulse.

== Experimental evidence ==
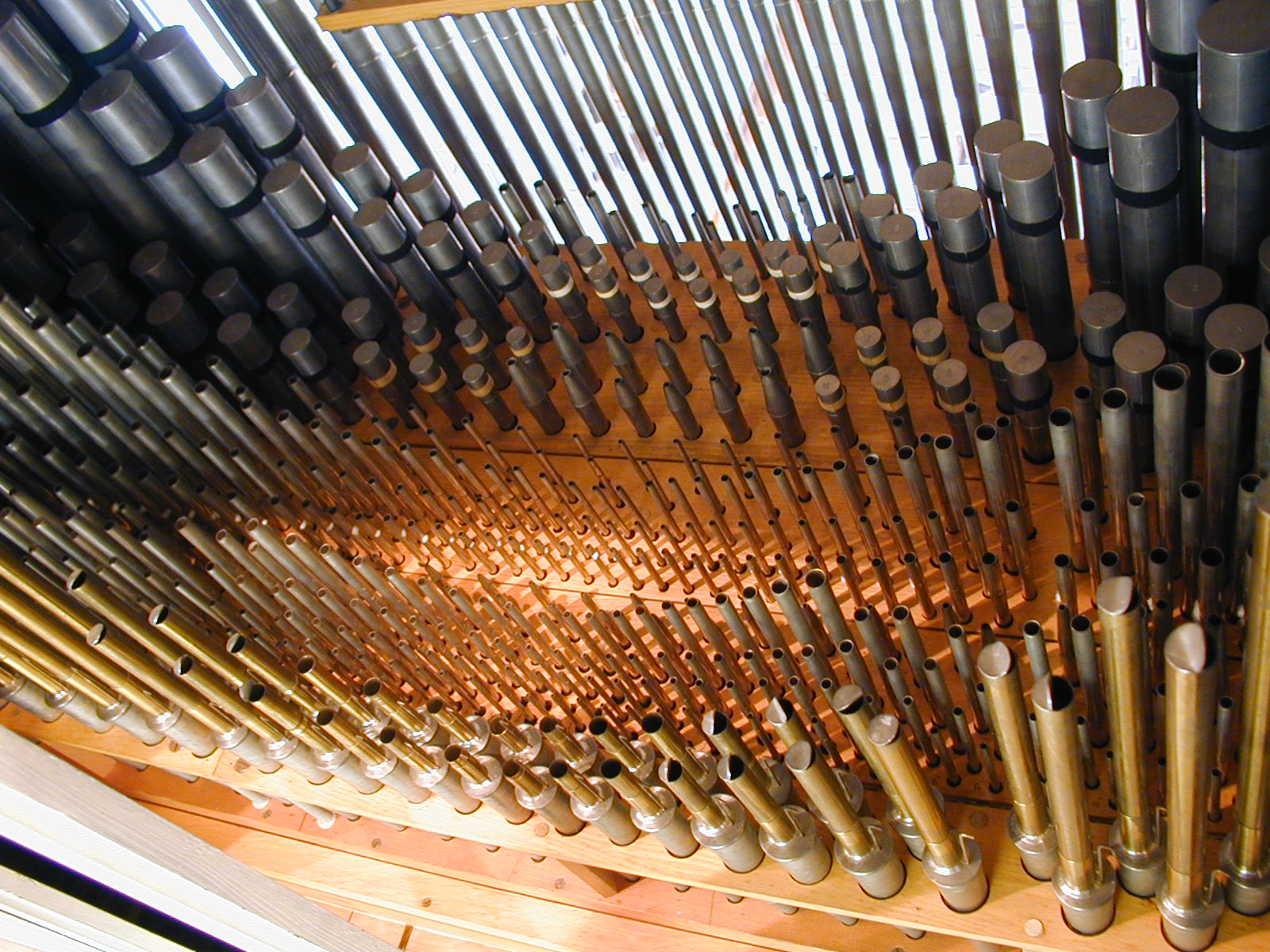
Organ pipes were often used in early hearing experiments.

Due to the invasiveness of most hearing related experiments, it is difficult to use human models in the study of the auditory system. However, many findings have been revealed in cats and guinea pigs. Additionally, there are few ways to study the basilar membrane in vivo.

=== Sound Stimuli ===
Many revolutionary concepts regarding hearing and encoding sound in the brain were founded in the late nineteenth and early twentieth centuries. Various tools were used to induce a response in auditory nerves, and that were to be recorded. Experiments by Helmholtz, Wever, and Bray often involved the use of organ pipes, stretched springs, loaded reeds, lamellas, vibrating forks, beats, and interruption tones to create “clicks”, harmonics, or pure tones. Today, electronic oscillators are often used to create sinusoidal or square waves of precise frequencies.

=== Electrophysiology ===
Attempts to electrically record from the auditory nerve began as early as 1896. Electrodes were placed into the auditory nerve of various animal models to give insight on the rate at which the neurons are firing. In a 1930 experiment involving the auditory nerve of a cat, Wever and Bray found that 100–5000 Hz sounds played to the cat produced similar frequency firing in the nerve. This supported the frequency theory and the volley theory.

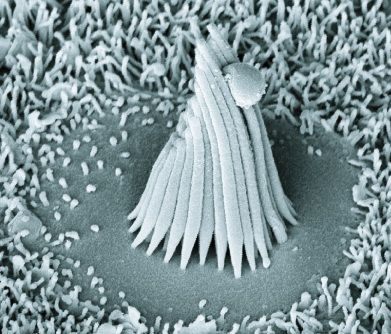
A hair cell from a frog sacculus.

=== Stroboscopic illumination ===
Pioneered by Georg von Békésy, a method to observe the basilar membrane in action came about in the mid 1900s. Békésy isolated the cochlea from human and animal cadavers and labeled the basilar membrane with silver flakes. This allowed strobe imaging to capture the movement of the membrane as sounds stimulated the hair cells. This led to the solidification of the idea that high frequencies excite the basal end of the cochlea and provided new information that low frequencies excite a large area of the cochlea. This new finding suggested that specialized properties are occurring for high frequency hearing and that low frequencies involve mechanisms explained in the frequency theory.

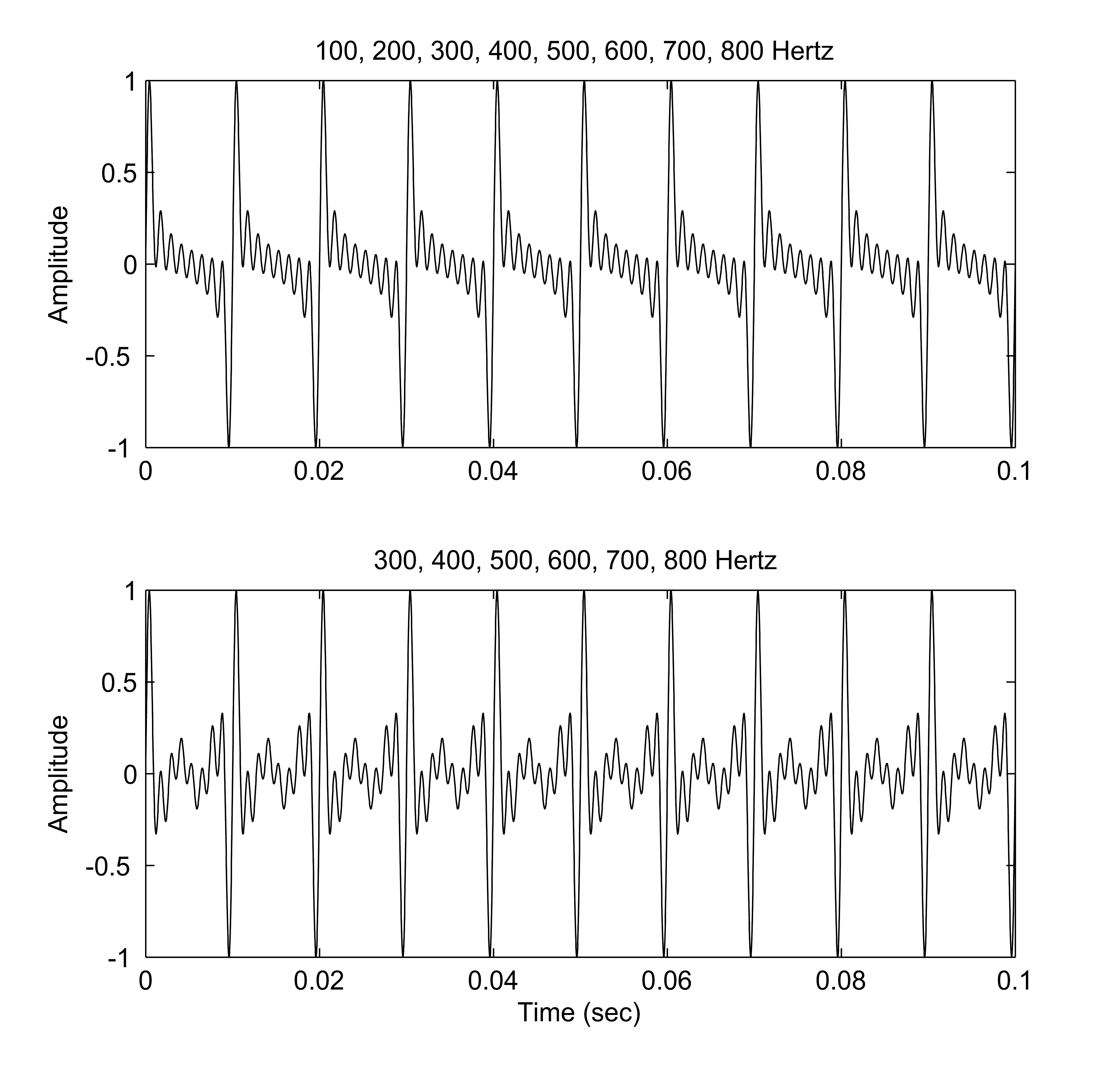
Illustration of full spectrum and missing fundamental waveforms

=== Missing fundamental ===
A fundamental frequency is the lowest frequency of a harmonic. In some cases, sound can have all the frequencies of a harmonic but be missing the fundamental frequency, this is known as missing fundamental. When listening to a sound with a missing fundamental, the human brain still receives information for all frequencies, including the fundamental frequency which does not exist in the sound. This implies that sound is encoded by neurons firing at all frequencies of a harmonic, therefore, the neurons must be locked in some way to result in the hearing of one sound.

=== Hearing loss and deafness ===
Congenital deafness or sensorineural hearing loss is an often used model for the study of the inner ear regarding pitch perception and theories of hearing in general. Frequency analysis of these individuals’ hearing has given insight on common deviations from normal tuning curves, excitation patterns, and frequency discrimination ranges. By applying pure or complex tones, information on pitch perception can be obtained. In 1983, it was shown that subjects with low frequency sensorineural hearing loss demonstrated abnormal psychophysical tuning curves. Changes in the spatial responses in these subjects showed similar pitch judgment abilities when compared to subjects with normal spatial responses. This was especially true regarding low frequency stimuli. These results suggest that the place theory of hearing does not explain pitch perception at low frequencies, but that the temporal (frequency) theory is more likely. This conclusion is due to the finding that when deprived of basilar membrane place information, these patients still demonstrated normal pitch perception. Computer models for pitch perception and loudness perception are often used during hearing studies on acoustically impaired subjects. The combination of this modeling and knowledge of natural hearing allows for better development of hearing aids.
