= Bob Shannon =

Bob Shannon may refer to:

- Bob Shannon (American football), high school football coach
- Bob Shannon (radio personality) (born 1948), radio name of current New York City area DJ Don Bombard
- R. J. Adams (1942–2015), another radio personality known as Bob Shannon

== See also ==
- Robert Shannon (disambiguation)
