= Robert V. Shannon =

Professor of otolaryngology

- Education: PhD, University of California, San Diego, CA, USA
- Scientific career
- Fields: Biomedical Engineering, Auditory sciences
- Institutions: House Ear Institute, Los Angeles, CA, USA; University of Southern California, Los Angeles, CA, USA
- Thesis: "Suppression of Forward Masking" (1975)
- Doctoral advisor: David M. Green
- Doctoral students: Deniz Başkent

Robert V. Shannon is research professor of Otolaryngology-Head & Neck Surgery and Affiliated Research Professor of Biomedical Engineering at University of Southern California, CA, USA. Shannon investigates the basic mechanisms underlying auditory neural processing by users of cochlear implants, auditory brainstem implants, and midbrain implants.

== Biography ==
Shannon received his B.A. degrees in Mathematics and Psychology from the University of Iowa, Iowa City, Iowa, in 1971. After obtaining his PhD in psychology at the University of California, San Diego, CA, USA, in 1975, he completed two postdocs, one at Institute for Perception, Nederlandse Organisatie voor Toegepast Natuurwetenschappelijk Onderzoek (TNO; English: Netherlands Organisation for Applied Scientific Research), Soesterberg, Netherlands, and University of California, Irvine, CA, USA. After faculty positions at University of California, San Francisco, CA, USA, and Boys Town National Research Hospital (BTNRH), he served as the director of Department of Auditory Implant and Perception Research, House Ear Institute, Los Angeles, CA, USA, with an affiliated research professor position at Biomedical Engineering, University of Southern California, Los Angeles, CA, USA.

Shannon has been a founding organizer of Conference on Implantable Auditory Prostheses (CIAP). In 1996, Shannon was elected Fellow of the Acoustical Society of America "for contributions in the psychoelectric study of hearing." In 2007, Shannon served as the President of Association for Research in Otolaryngology (ARO), and in 2011 he was the Recipient of ARO Award of Merit.

As of 2018, Shannon is serving as a Member of Hearing4All Scientific Advisory Board, and Board of Directors of Hearing Health Foundation.

== Research ==
Shannon has been one of the earlier and main researchers studying the psychophysics of electrical stimulation in cochlear-implant users, laying out the foundations for fundamental limitations and capabilities of sound perception with a cochlear implant. Later, Shannon has expanded his research to also include auditory brainstem implants and auditory midbrain implants.

A key early contribution was the development of a research interface that could be used by researchers to independently achieve stimulus control in electric stimulation (now referred to as direct stimulation). In 1995, Shannon and colleagues published a study on perception of speech that was manipulated in temporal envelope and fine structure. More specifically, using noiseband vocoding, inherent degradations of cochlear-implant speech signal transmission were (loosely) mimicked by removing most temporal fine structure and limiting envelope information to a small number of spectral channels. This paper showed both the importance of envelope information for speech perception, as well as providing an initial explanation why, in quiet listening environments, cochlear-implant users can perceive speech well, despite those degradations. In a later study, Shannon and colleagues provided early evidence that one of the main limiting factors in speech perception by cochlear-implant users is reduced spectral resolution. What this paper showed was that the limitation in spectral resolution was not caused by the limited number of electrodes, which each delivers distinct spectral information of speech. Instead, it seemed to be caused by an internal factor, namely, channel interactions, a consequence of direct electric stimulation of the auditory nerve.

Shannon has supervised a number of PhD students and postdocs, whose projects lead to a comprehensive exploration of the effects of front-end processing and related parameters of cochlear-implant signal processing and electrode placement on sound and speech perception.
