= Pure tone =

Sound with a sinusoidal waveform

A pure tone's pressure waveform versus time looks like this; its frequency determines the x axis scale; its amplitude determines the y axis scale; and its phase determines the x origin.

In psychoacoustics and signal processing, a pure tone is a sound or other signal with a sinusoidal waveform; that is, a sine wave of constant frequency, phase-shift, and amplitude. A pure tone has the property – unique among real-valued wave shapes – that its wave shape is unchanged by linear time-invariant systems; that is, only the phase and amplitude change between such a system's pure-tone input and its output.

Sine and cosine waves can be used as basic building blocks of more complex waves. As additional sine waves having different frequencies are combined, the waveform transforms from a sinusoidal shape into a more complex shape. When considered as part of a whole spectrum, a pure tone may also be called a spectral component.

In clinical audiology, pure tones are used for pure-tone audiometry to characterize hearing thresholds at different frequencies. Sound localization is often more difficult with pure tones than with other sounds.

== Relation to pitch and musical tones ==
Pure tones have been used by 19th century physicists like Georg Ohm and Hermann von Helmholtz to support theories asserting that the ear functions in a way equivalent to a Fourier frequency analysis. In Ohm's acoustic law, later further elaborated by Helmholtz, musical tones are perceived as a set of pure tones. The percept of pitch depends on the frequency of the most prominent tone, and the phases of the individual components is discarded. This theory has often been blamed for creating a confusion between pitch, frequency and pure tones.

Unlike musical tones that are composed of the sum of a number of harmonically related sinusoidal components, pure tones only contain one such sinusoidal waveform. When presented in isolation, and when its frequency pertains to a certain range, pure tones give rise to a single pitch percept, which can be characterized by its frequency. In this situation, the instantaneous phase of the pure tone varies linearly with time. If a pure tone gives rise to a constant, steady-state percept, then it can be concluded that its phase does not influence this percept. However, when multiple pure tones are presented at once, like in musical tones, their relative phase plays a role in the resulting percept. In such a situation, the perceived pitch is not determined by the frequency of any individual component, but by the frequency relationship between these components (see missing fundamental).

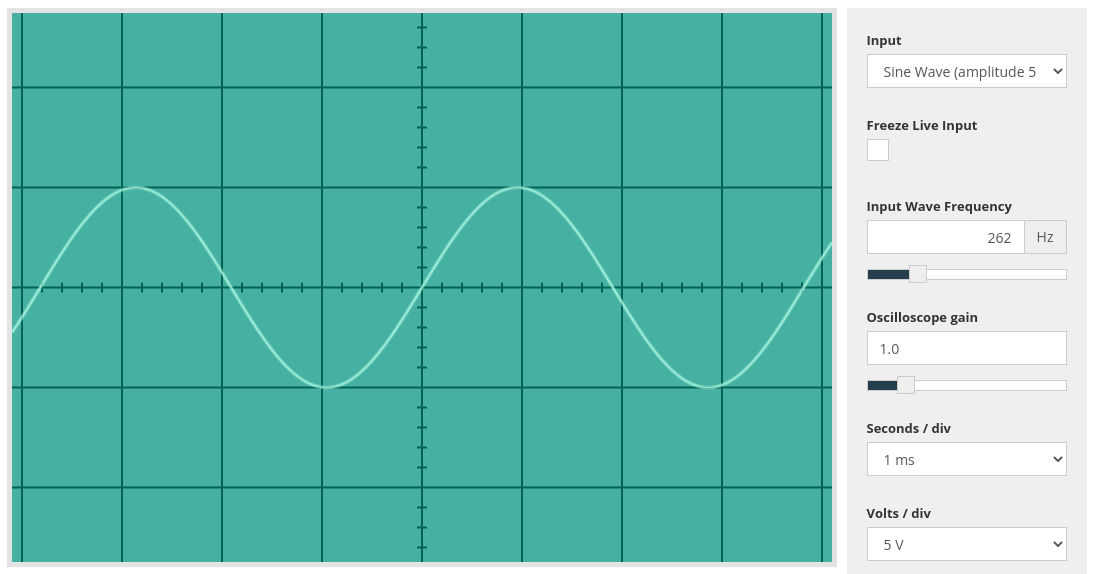
Pure tone oscillogram of middle C (262 Hz). (Scale: 1 square is equal to 1 millisecond)

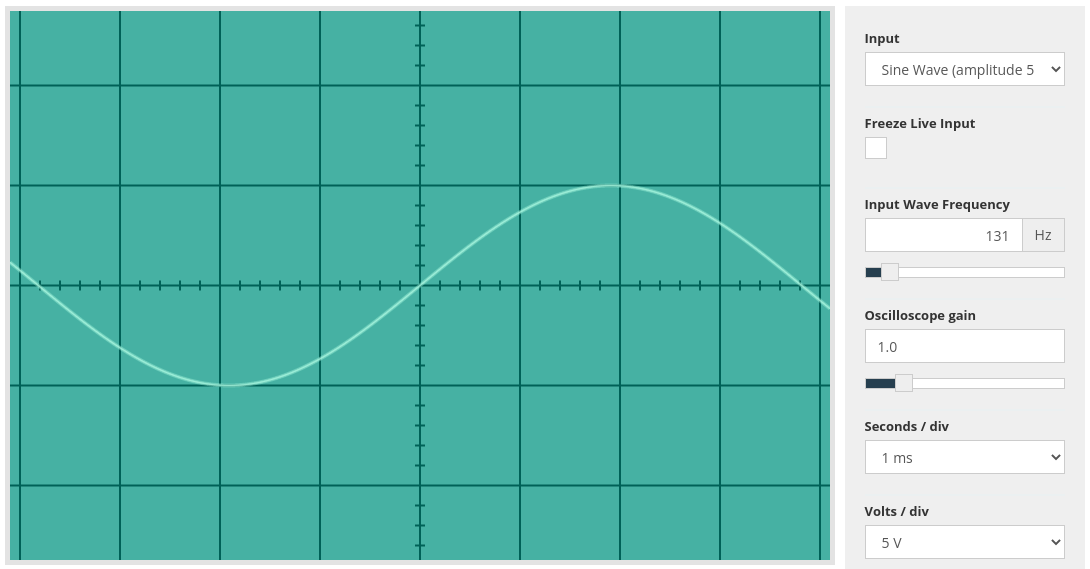
Pure tone for C3, an octave below middle C. The frequency is half that of middle C (131 Hz).

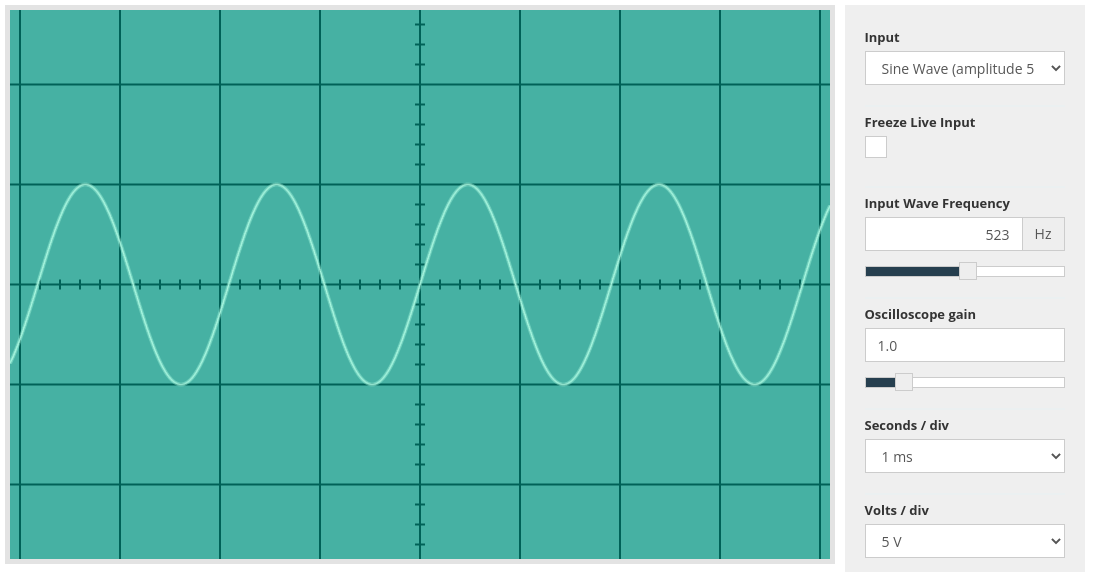
Pure tone oscillogram of C5, an octave above middle C. The frequency is twice that of middle C (523 Hz).

== See also ==
- Sound
- Pitch (music)
- Musical tone
- Missing fundamental
- Spectral flatness
