= Missing fundamental =

Acoustic phenomenon

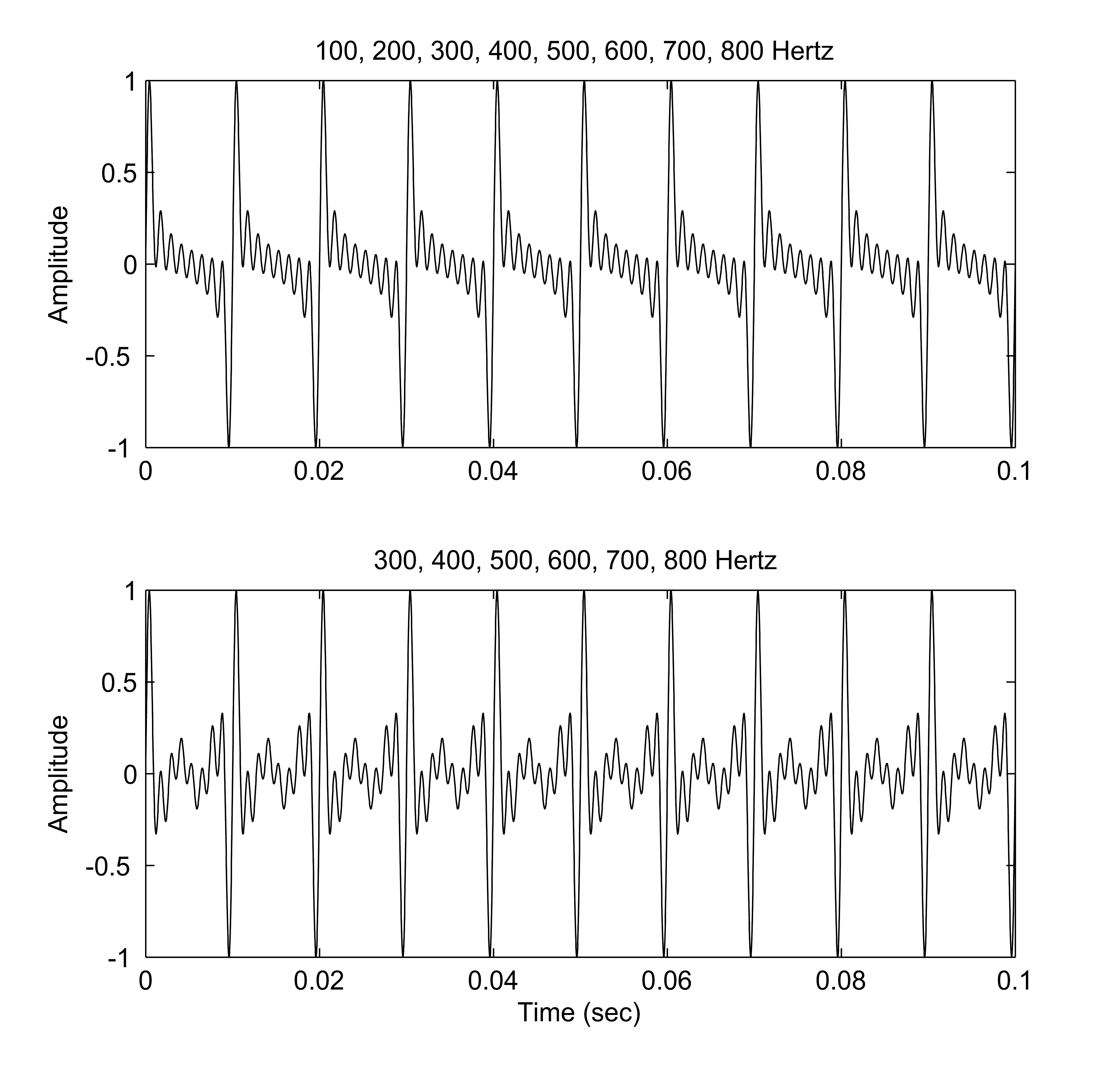
The bottom waveform is missing the fundamental frequency, 100 hertz, and the second harmonic, 200 hertz. The periodicity is nevertheless clear when compared to the full-spectrum waveform on top.

The missing fundamental phenomenon is the perceptual phenomenon of hearing a pitch corresponding to the lowest (fundamental) harmonic when presented with sound made of a set of frequency multiples (overtones), even when it is actually absent. This can be used to simulate lower frequency sounds with speakers that cannot actually play those frequencies, by playing the overtones that are within its range.

It is established in psychoacoustics that the auditory system, with its natural tendency to distinguish a tone from another, will persistently assign a pitch to a complex tone given that a sufficient set of harmonics are present in the spectrum.

For example, when a note (that is not a pure tone) has a pitch of 100 Hz, it will consist of frequency components that are integer multiples of that value (e.g. 100, 200, 300, 400, 500.... Hz). However, smaller loudspeakers may not produce low frequencies, so in our example, the 100 Hz component may be missing. Nevertheless, a pitch corresponding to the fundamental may still be heard.

== Explanation ==
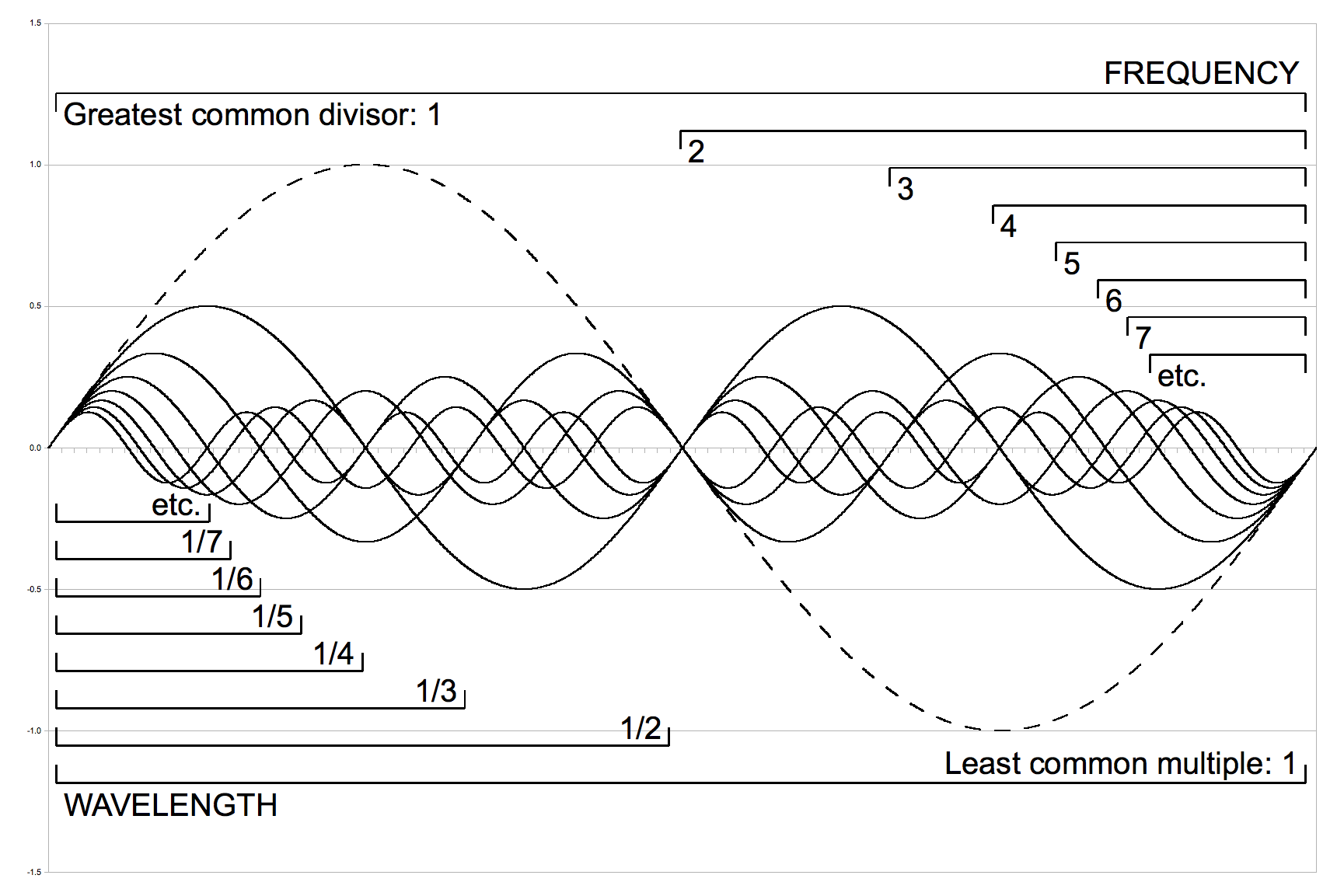
The GCD of the frequency of all harmonics is the fundamental (dashed).

A low pitch (also known as the pitch of the missing fundamental or virtual pitch) can sometimes be heard when there is no apparent source or component of that frequency. This perception is due to the brain interpreting repetition patterns that are present.

It was once thought that this effect was because the missing fundamental was replaced by distortions introduced by the physics of the ear. However, experiments subsequently showed that when a noise was added that would have masked these distortions had they been present, listeners still heard a pitch corresponding to the missing fundamental, as reported by J. C. R. Licklider in 1954. It is now widely accepted that the brain processes the information present in the overtones to calculate the fundamental frequency. The precise way in which it does so is still a matter of debate, but the processing seems to be based on an autocorrelation involving the timing of neural impulses in the auditory nerve. However, it has long been noted that any neural mechanisms which may accomplish a delay (a necessary operation of a true autocorrelation) have not been found. At least one model shows a temporal delay to be unnecessary to produce an autocorrelation model of pitch perception, appealing to phase shifts between cochlear filters; however, earlier work has shown that certain sounds with a prominent peak in their autocorrelation function do not elicit a corresponding pitch percept, and that certain sounds without a peak in their autocorrelation function nevertheless elicit a pitch. Autocorrelation can thus be considered, at best, an incomplete model.

The pitch of the missing fundamental, usually at the greatest common divisor of the frequencies present, is not, however, always perceived. Research conducted at Heidelberg University shows that, under narrow stimulus conditions with a small number of harmonics, the general population can be divided into those who perceive missing fundamentals, and those who primarily hear the overtones instead. This was done by asking subjects to judge the direction of motion (up or down) of two complexes in succession. The authors used structural MRI and MEG to show that the preference for missing fundamental hearing correlated with left-hemisphere lateralization of pitch perception, where the preference for spectral hearing correlated with right-hemisphere lateralization, and those who exhibited the latter preference tended to be musicians.

A 2013 study by D. Robert Ladd et al. finds that sensitivity to perceive missing fundamental varies across individuals.

== Examples ==
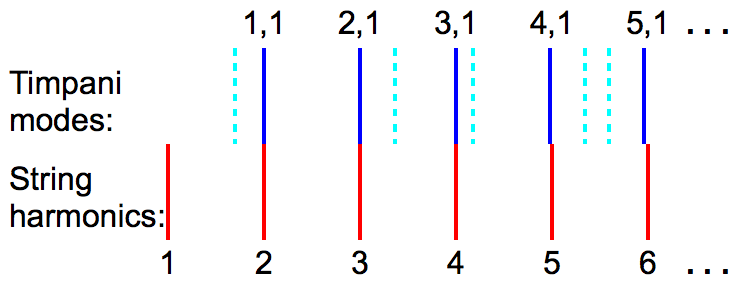
Timpani bodies modify modes of vibration to match harmonics. Red: Harmonics of perceived pitch. Dark blue: Prominent modes of vibration.

Timpani produce inharmonic overtones, but are constructed and tuned to produce near-harmonic overtones to an implied missing fundamental. Hit in the usual way (half to three-quarters the distance from the center to the rim), the fundamental note of a timpani is very weak in relation to its second through fifth "harmonic" overtones. A timpani might be tuned to produce sound most strongly at 200, 302, 398, and 488 Hz, for instance, implying a missing fundamental at 100 Hz (though the actual dampened fundamental is 170 Hz).

A violin's lowest air and body resonances generally fall between 250 Hz and 300 Hz. The fundamental frequency of the open G3 string is below 200 Hz in modern tunings as well as most historical tunings, so the lowest notes of a violin have an attenuated fundamental, although listeners seldom notice this.

Most common telephones cannot reproduce sounds lower than 300 Hz, but a male voice has a fundamental frequency of approximately 150 Hz. Because of the missing fundamental effect, the fundamental frequencies of male voices are still perceived as their pitches over the telephone.

The missing fundamental phenomenon is used electronically by some pro audio manufacturers to allow sound systems to seem to produce notes that are lower in pitch than they are capable of reproducing. In a hardware effects unit or a software plugin, a crossover filter is set at a low frequency above which the sound system is capable of safely reproducing tones. Musical signal content above the high-pass part of the crossover filter is sent to the main output which is amplified by the sound system. Low frequency content below the low-pass part of the crossover filter is sent to a circuit where harmonics are synthesized above the low notes. The newly created harmonics are mixed back into the main output to create a perception of the filtered-out low notes. Using a device with this synthetic process can reduce complaints from low frequency noise carrying through walls and it can be employed to reduce low frequency content in loud music that might otherwise vibrate and damage breakable valuables.

Some pipe organs make use of this phenomenon as a resultant tone, which allows relatively smaller bass pipes to produce very low-pitched sounds.

== Audio processing applications ==
This very concept of "missing fundamental" being reproduced based on the overtones in the tone has been used to create the illusion of bass in sound systems that are not capable of such bass. In mid-1999, Meir Shashoua of Tel Aviv, co-founder of Waves Audio, patented an algorithm to create the sense of the missing fundamental by synthesizing higher harmonics. Waves Audio released the MaxxBass plug-in to allow computer users to apply the synthesized harmonics to their audio files. Later, Waves Audio produced small subwoofers that relied on the missing fundamental concept to give the illusion of low bass. Both products processed certain overtones selectively to help small loudspeakers, ones which could not reproduce low-frequency components, to sound as if they were capable of low bass. Both products included a high-pass filter which greatly attenuated all the low frequency tones that were expected to be beyond the capabilities of the target sound system. One example of a popular song that was recorded with MaxxBass processing is "Lady Marmalade", the 2001 Grammy award-winning version sung by Christina Aguilera, Lil' Kim, Mýa, and Pink, produced by Missy Elliott.

Other software and hardware companies have developed their own versions of missing fundamental-based bass augmentation products. The poor bass reproduction of earbuds has been identified as a possible target for such processing. Many computer sound systems are not capable of low bass, and songs offered to consumers via computer have been identified as ones that may benefit from augmented bass harmonics processing.

== See also ==
- Psychoacoustics
- Subharmonic
