= Ohm's acoustic law =

Law according to which a sound is perceived by the ear as a number of pure harmonic tones

Ohm's acoustic law, sometimes called the acoustic phase law or simply Ohm's law, states that a musical sound is perceived by the ear as a set of a number of constituent pure harmonic tones.

The law was proposed by physicist Georg Ohm in 1843. Hermann von Helmholtz elaborated the law into what is often today known as Ohm's acoustic law, by adding that the quality of a tone depends solely on the number and relative strength of its partial simple tones, and not on their relative phases. Helmholtz championed the law in opposition to contrary evidence expounded by August Seebeck.

The law has also been interpreted as "a pitch corresponding to a certain frequency can only be heard if the acoustical wave contains power at that frequency."

These laws are true to the extent that the ear is sensitive to the frequency and amplitude of the acoustic waves, and further, is able to resolve the differences in their frequency. In modern times, the sensitivity of human hearing to the phase of tone components has been extensively investigated. Controversy has led to this characterization:

For years musicians have been told that the ear is able to separate any complex signal into a series of sinusoidal signals – that it acts as a Fourier analyzer. This quarter-truth, known as Ohm's Other Law, has served to increase the distrust with which perceptive musicians regard scientists, since it is readily apparent to them that the ear acts in this way only under very restricted conditions.

— W. Dixon Ward (1970)
