= Scale of vowels =

Arrangement of vowels

A scale of vowels is an arrangement of vowels in order of perceived "pitch".

A scale used for poetry in American English lists the vowels by the frequency of the second formant (the higher of the two overtones that define a vowel sound). Starting with the highest,

vowel	example
iː	key
eɪ	cane
aɪ	kite
ɪ	kit
ɛ	ken
æ	cat
ɝː	cur
ʌ	cut
ɑː	cot, car
aʊ	cow
ɔɪ	coy
ɔː	caught, core
ʊ	could
oʊ	coat
uː	cool, cute

In technical terms, this listing goes from front vowels to back vowels. It is by no means precise enough for phonology. For one thing, the sounds with [ʊ] or [ɪ] as the second symbol are diphthongs, during which the formants change. Also, many American accents and practically all from other countries will require different lists. Nonetheless this scale has been used in poetry. For instance, one can identify lines that generally go upward—

O love, be fed with apples while you may… (Robert Graves)
/oʊ ˈlʊv bi ˈfɛd wɪθ ˈæ.pl̩z ˈwaɪl ju ˈmeɪ/

or downward—

When lilacs last in the dooryard bloom'd… (Walt Whitman)
/wɛn ˈlaɪ.læks ˌlæst ɪn ðə ˈdɔɹ.jɑɹd ˌblumd/

A pendeka (from the Greek for "fifteen") is a poem containing each of the above vowels once. The following example, which goes up the scale, is intended strictly as a mnemonic.

Mood: no good, brought voice
Down, not up, perhaps
Ends with—Hi, baby!

== Not to be confused with ==
The high- and low-frequency vowels described here are not the high vowels and low vowels of linguistics. Those are vowels where the tongue is high (as in "cool" and "key") or low (as in "car") respectively. Also, this scale is not the sonority hierarchy.
