= Occupational hearing loss =

Form of hearing loss

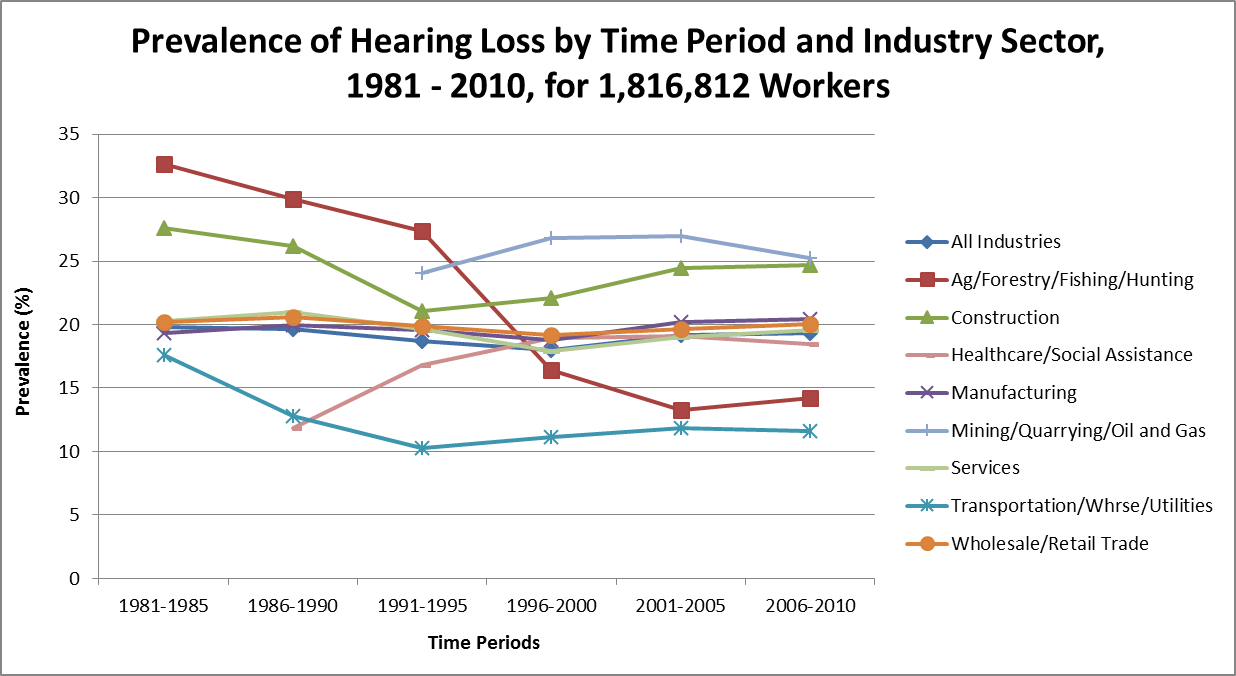
Graph of prevalence of hearing loss over time for workers in various sectors in the United States

Occupational hearing loss (OHL) is hearing loss that occurs as a result of occupational hazards, such as excessive noise and ototoxic chemicals. Noise is a common workplace hazard, and recognized as the risk factor for noise-induced hearing loss and tinnitus but it is not the only risk factor that can result in a work-related hearing loss. Also, noise-induced hearing loss can result from exposures that are not restricted to the occupational setting.

OHL is a prevalent occupational concern in various work environments worldwide. In the United States, organizations such as the Occupational Safety and Health Administration (OSHA), the National Institute for Occupational Safety and Health (NIOSH) and the Mine Safety and Health Administration (MSHA) work with employers and workers to reduce or eliminate occupational hearing hazards through a hierarchy of hazard controls. OHL is one of the most common work-related illness in the United States. Occupational hearing hazards include industrial noise, and exposure to various ototoxic chemicals. Combined exposure to both industrial noise and ototoxic chemicals may cause more damage than either one would in isolation. Many chemicals have not been tested for ototoxicity, so unknown threats may exist.

A 2016 study by NIOSH found that the mining sector had the highest prevalence of hearing impairment at 17%, followed by the construction sector (16%) and the manufacturing sector (14%). The public safety sector had the lowest rate of hearing impairment, at 7%. Overall, audiometric records show that about 33% of working-age adults with a history of occupational noise exposure have evidence of noise-induced hearing damage, and 16% of noise-exposed workers have material hearing impairment. In the service sector the prevalence of hearing loss was 17% compared to 16% for all industries combined. Several sub-sectors however exceeded the overall prevalence (10-33% higher) and/or had adjusted risks significantly higher than the reference industry. Workers in Administration of Urban Planning and Community and Rural Development had the highest prevalence (50%), and workers in Solid Waste Combustors and Incinerators had more than double the risk, the highest of any sub-sector. Some sub-sectors traditionally viewed as "low-risk" such as Real Estate and Rental and Leasing, and financial sub-sectors (Credit Unions, Call centers), and also had high prevalences and risks.

Personal protective equipment, administrative controls, and engineering controls can all work to reduce exposure to noise and chemicals, either by providing the worker with protection such as earplugs, or by reducing the noise or chemicals at the source or limiting the time or level of exposure.

== Background ==
External videos
- A video hosted by the National Hearing Conservation Association about noise-exposed workers with hearing loss or tinnitus

OHL is defined as any type of hearing loss, i.e. sensorineural, conductive, or mixed hearing loss, that occurs due to hazardous characteristics of a work environment. The hearing loss can range in severity from mild to profound and can be accompanied by tinnitus. Hazards of a work environment that can result in OHL include excessive noise, ototoxic chemicals, or physical trauma. OHL caused by excessive exposure to noise is also known as noise-induced hearing loss (NIHL). Noise exposure combined with ototoxic chemical exposure can results in more damage to hearing. OHL caused by physical trauma may include foreign bodies in the ear, vibration, barotrauma, or head injury. OHL, as well as hearing loss in general, can cause negative secondary social and emotional effects that can impact quality of life.

Within the United States of America, approximately 10 million people have NIHL. Over twice that number (~22 million) are occupationally exposed to dangerous noise levels. Hearing loss accounted for a sizable percentage of occupational illness in 2007, at 14% of cases. United States government agencies such as OSHA, NIOSH and MSHA are working to understand the causes of OHL and how it can be prevented while providing regulations and guidelines to help protect the hearing of workers in all occupations.

== Causes ==
=== Noise exposure ===
Exposure to noise can cause vibrations able to cause permanent damage to the ear. Both the volume of the noise and the duration of exposure can influence the likelihood of damage. Sound is measured in units called decibels, which is a logarithmic scale of sound levels that corresponds to the level of loudness that an individual's ear would perceive. Because it is a logarithmic scale, even small incremental increases in decibels correlate to large increases in loudness, and an increase in the risk of hearing loss.

Sounds above 85 dB have the potential to cause permanent hearing loss. The intensity of sound is considered too great and hazardous if someone must yell in order to be heard. Ringing in the ears upon leaving work is also indicative of noise that is at a dangerous level. Farming, machinery work, and construction are some of the many occupations that put workers at risk of hearing loss.

NIOSH establishes recommended exposure limits (RELs) to protect workers against the health effects of exposure to hazardous substances and agents encountered in the workplace. These NIOSH limits are based on the best available science and practices. NIOSH established the REL for occupational noise exposures to be 85 decibels, A-weighted (dB[A]) as an 8-hour time-weighted average. Occupational noise exposure at or above this level are considered hazardous. The REL is based on exposures at work 5 days per week and assumes that the individual spends the other 16 hours in the day, as well as weekends, in quieter conditions. NIOSH also specifies a maximum allowable daily noise dose, expressed in percentages. For example, a person continuously exposed to 85 dB(A) over an 8-hour work shift will reach 100% of their daily noise dose. This dose limit uses a 3-dB time-intensity tradeoff commonly referred to as the exchange rate or equal-energy rule: for every 3-dB increase in noise level, the allowable exposure time is reduced by half. For example, if the exposure level increases to 88 dB(A), workers should only be exposed for four hours. Alternatively, for every 3-dB decrease in noise level, the allowable exposure time is doubled, as shown in the table below.

OSHA's current permissible exposure limit (PEL) for workers is an average of 90 dB over an 8-hour work day. Unlike NIOSH, OSHA uses a 5-dB exchange rate, where an increase in 5-dB for a sound corresponds to the amount of time workers may be exposed to that particular source of sound being halved. For example, workers cannot be exposed to a sound level of 95 dB for more than 4 hours per day, or to sounds at 100 dB for more than 2 hours per day. Employers who expose workers to 85 dB or more for 8 hour shifts are required to provide hearing exams and protection, monitor noise levels, and provide training.

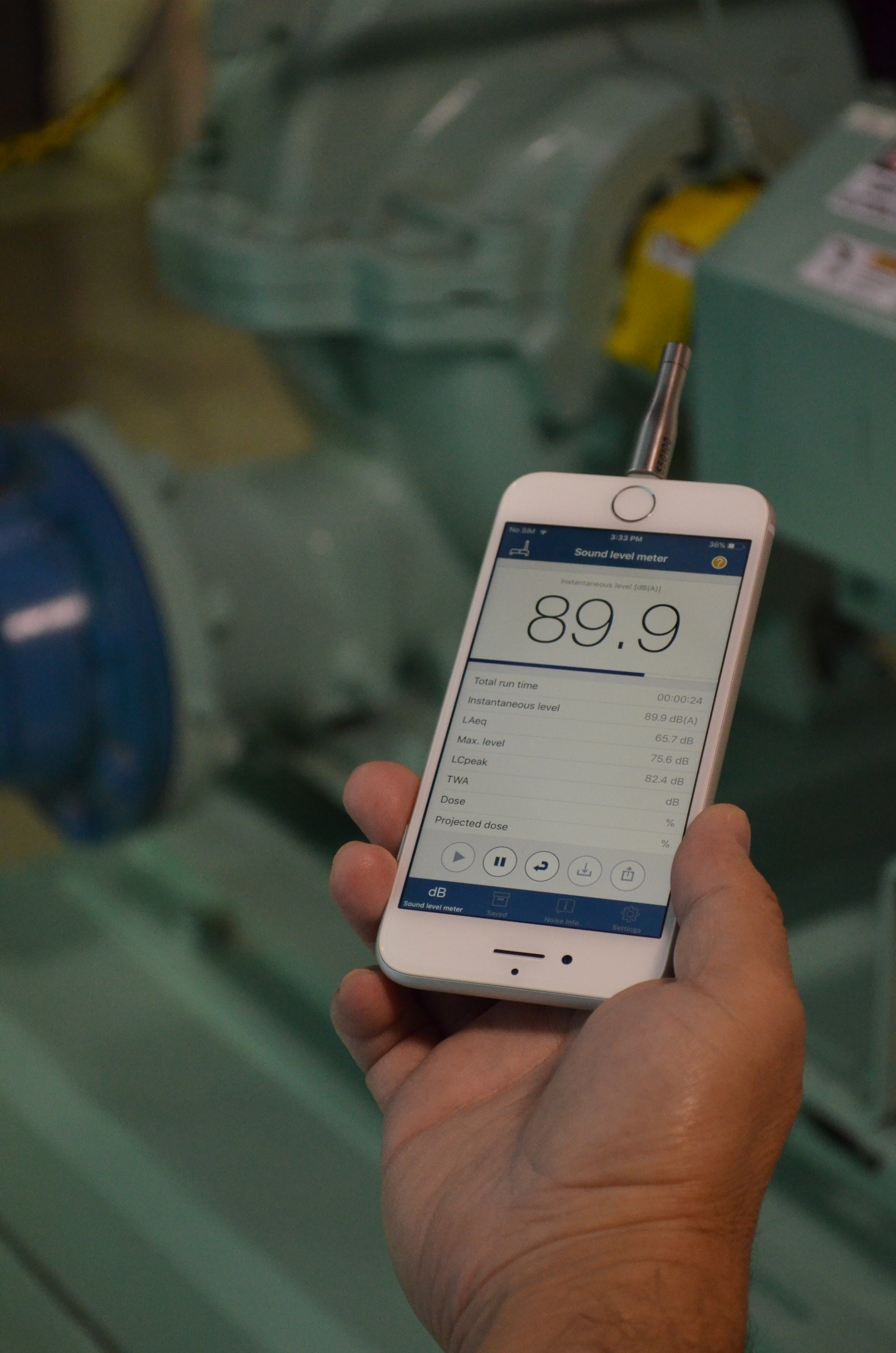
The NIOSH Sound Level Meter app

Relationship between noise exposure levels and duration of allowable exposure at that level for NIOSH and OSHA
Time to reach 100% noise dose	Exposure level per NIOSH REL	Exposure level per OSHA PEL
8 hours	85 dBA	90 dBA
4 hours	88 dBA	95 dBA
2 hours	91 dBA	100 dBA
1 hours	94 dBA	105 dBA
30 minutes	97 dBA	110 dBA
15 minutes	100 dBA	115 dBA

Sound level meters and dosimeters are two types of devices that are used to measure sound levels in the workplace. Dosimeters are typically worn by the employee to measure their own personal sound exposure. Other sound level meters can be used to double check dosimeter measurements, or used when dosimeters cannot be worn by the employees. They can also be used to evaluate engineering controls aimed at reducing noise levels.

Some recent studies suggest that some smartphone applications may be able to measure noise as precisely as a Type 2 SLM. Although most smartphone sound measurement apps are not accurate enough to be used for legally required measurements, the NIOSH Sound Level Meter app met the requirements of IEC 61672/ANSI S1.4 Sound Level Meter Standards (Electroacoustics - Sound Level Meters - Part 3: Periodic Tests).

=== Ototoxic chemical exposure ===
Chemically induced hearing loss (CIHL) is a potential result of occupational exposures. Certain chemical compounds may have ototoxic effects. Exposure to organic solvents, heavy metals, and asphyxiants such as carbon monoxide can all cause hearing loss. These chemicals can be inhaled, ingested, or absorbed through the skin. Damage can occur to either the inner ear or the auditory nerve. Certain medications may also have the potential to cause hearing loss.

Both noise and chemical exposures are common in many industries, and can both contribute to hearing loss simultaneously. Damage may be more likely or more severe if both are present, in particular if noise is impulsive. Industries in which combinations of exposures may exist include construction, fiberglass, metal manufacturing, and many more.

It is estimated that over 22 million workers are exposed to dangerous noise levels, and 10 million are exposed to solvents that could potentially cause hearing loss every year, with an unknown number exposed to other ototoxic chemicals. A 2018 informational bulletin by the US Occupational Safety and Health Administration (OSHA) and the National Institute for Occupational Safety and Health (NIOSH) introduces the issue, provides examples of ototoxic chemicals, lists the industries and occupations at risk and provides prevention information.

== Prevention ==
OHL is preventable, but currently the interventions to prevent it involve many components. Stricter legislation might reduce noise levels in the workplace. Hearing protection devices, such as earmuffs and earplugs can reduce noise exposure to safe levels, but, instructions are needed on how to put plugs into the ears correctly to achieve potential attenuation. Giving workers information on their noise exposure levels by itself was not shown to decrease noise. Engineering solutions might lead to similar noise reduction as that provided by hearing protection, but better evaluation of the noise exposures resulting from engineering interventions is needed, as most of the available information is limited to observations in laboratory conditions. Overall, the effects of hearing loss prevention programs are unclear. Better use of hearing protection as part of a program but does not necessarily protect against hearing loss. The 2017 Cochrane review concluded that in order to prevent NIHL in the workplace the quality of the implementation of prevention programs, particularly on the hearing protection component of the program, affects results, and that better quality of studies, especially in the field of engineering controls, and better implementation of legislation are needed. While the review concluded there is a lack of conclusive evidence it highlighted that this should not be interpreted as evidence of lack of effectiveness. The implication is that future research could affect conclusions reached.

=== Hierarchy of controls ===
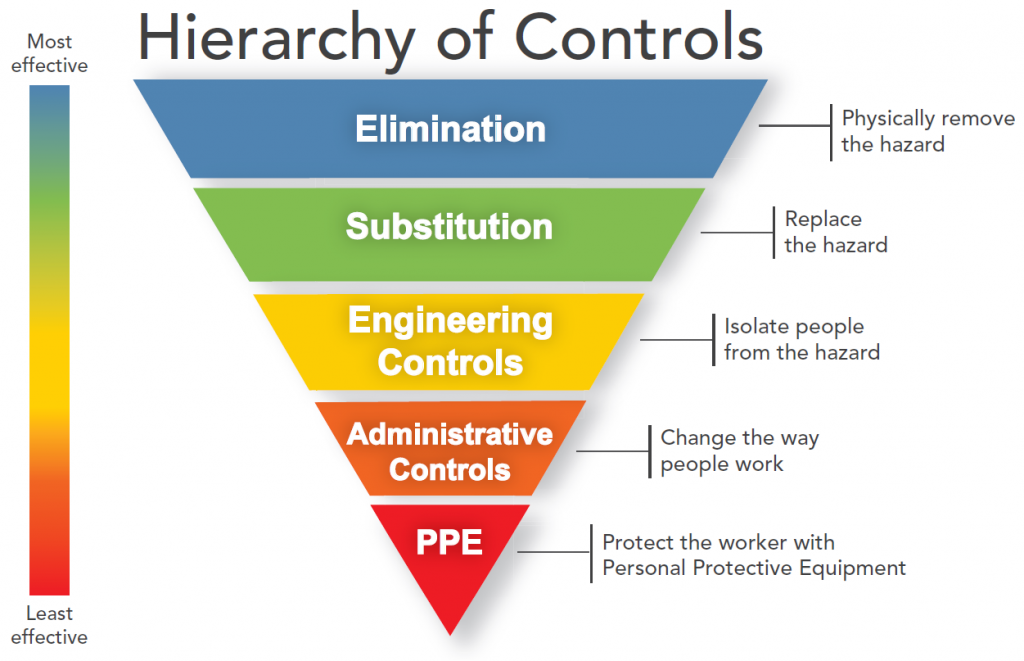
NIOSH Hierarchy of Controls

The hierarchy of controls provides a visual guide to the effectiveness of the various workplace controls set in place to eliminate or reduce exposure to occupational hazards, including noise or ototoxic chemicals. The hierarchy includes the following from most effective to least effective:

- Elimination: complete removal of the hazard
- Substitution: replacement that offers a smaller risk
- Engineering controls: physical changes to reduce exposure
- Administrative controls: changes in work procedures or training
- Personal protective equipment (PPE): individual equipment to reduce exposure, e.g. earplugs

==== Engineering controls ====
Engineering controls is the next highest in the hierarchy of risk reduction methods when elimination and substitution of the hazard are not possible. These types of controls typically involve making changes in equipment or other changes to minimize the level of noise that reaches a worker's ear. They may also involve measures such as barriers between the worker and the source of the noise, mufflers, regular maintenance of the machinery, or substituting quieter equipment.

The OSHA Technical Manual (OTM) on noise provides technical information about workplace hazards and controls to OSHA's Compliance Safety and Health Officers (CSHOs). The content of the OTM is based on currently available research publications, OSHA standards, and consensus standards. The OTM is available to the public for use by other health and safety professionals, employers, and anyone involved in developing or implementing an effective workplace safety and health program.

==== Administrative controls ====
Administrative control, behind engineering control, is the next best form of prevention of noise exposure. They can either reduce the exposure to noise, or reduce the decibel level of the noise itself. Limiting the amount of time a worker is allowed to be around an unsafe level of noise exposure, and creating procedures for operation of equipment that could produce harmful levels of noise are both examples of administrative controls.

==== Personal protection ====
Elimination or reduction of the source of noise or chemical exposure is ideal, but when that is not possible or adequate, wearing personal protective equipment (PPE) such as earplugs or earmuffs can help reduce the risk of hearing loss due to noise exposure. PPE should be a last resort and not be used in substitution for engineering or administrative controls. It is important that workers are properly trained on the use of PPE to ensure proper protection. A personal attenuation rating can be objectively measured through a hearing protection fit-testing system.

=== Other initiatives ===
In addition to the hierarchy of controls, other programs have been created to promote the prevention of hearing loss in the workplace. For example, the Buy Quiet program was created to encourage the purchase of quieter tools and machinery in the workplace. Additionally, the Safe-In-Sound award was created to recognize organizations that excel in preventing occupational hearing loss.

== History ==
Occupational hearing loss is a very present industrial issue that has been noticed since the Industrial Revolution. As industrial society continues to grow, this issue is becoming increasingly detrimental due to the exposure of chemicals and physical objects. Millions of employees have been affected by occupational hearing loss, especially in industry. Industrialized countries see most of these damages as they result in both economic and living problems.

Within the United States of America alone, 10 of the 28 million people that have experienced hearing loss related to noise exposure. Rarely do workers express concerns or complaints regarding Occupational hearing loss. In order to gather relevant information, workers who have experienced loud work environments are questioned regarding their hearing abilities during everyday activities. When analyzing OHP, it is necessary to consider family history, hobbies, recreational activities, and how they could play a role in a person's hearing loss. In order to test hearing loss, audiometers are used to and are adjusted to American National Standards Institute (ANSI) regulations. The Occupation and Safety Health Association (OSHA) of the United States of America requires a program that conserves hearing when noise levels are greater than 85 dB.

== See also ==
- Noise-induced hearing loss
- Hearing conservation programs
- Hearing protection fit-testing
- Hearing loss
- Tinnitus
- Ototoxicity
- Noise
- Safe-in-Sound Excellence in Hearing Loss Prevention Award
- Safe listening
- World Hearing Day
- World Report on Hearing, World Health Organization, 2021.
- Health problems of musicians
