= Occupational noise =

Noise exposure from work environment

Occupational noise is the amount of acoustic energy received by an employee's auditory system when they are working in the industry. Occupational noise, or industrial noise, is often a term used in occupational safety and health, as sustained exposure can cause permanent hearing damage. Occupational noise is considered an occupational hazard traditionally linked to loud industries such as ship-building, mining, railroad work, welding, and construction, but can be present in any workplace where hazardous noise is present.

== Regulation ==
In the US, the National Institute for Occupational Safety and Health (NIOSH) and the Occupational Safety and Health Administration (OSHA) work together to provide standards and regulations for noise in the workplace.

National Institute for Occupational Safety and Health (NIOSH), Occupational Safety and Health Administration (OSHA), Mine Safety and Health Administration (MSHA), Federal Railroad Administration (FRA) have all set standards on hazardous occupational noise in their respective industries. Each industry is different, as workers' tasks and equipment differ, but most regulations agree that noise becomes hazardous when it exceeds 85 decibels, for an 8-hour time exposure (typical work shift). This relationship between allotted noise level and exposure time is known as an exposure action value (EAV) or permissible exposure limit (PEL). The EAV or PEL can be seen as equations which manipulate the allotted exposure time according to the intensity of the industrial noise. This equation works as an inverse, exponential, relationship. As the industrial noise intensity increases, the allotted exposure time, to still remain safe, decreases. Thus, a worker exposed to a noise level of 100 decibels for 15 minutes would be at the same risk level as a worker exposed to 85 decibels for 8 hours. Using this mathematical relationship, an employer can calculate whether or not their employees are being overexposed to noise. When it is suspected that an employee will reach or exceed the PEL, a monitoring program for that employee should be implemented by the employer.

The above calculations of PEL and EAV are based on measurements taken to determine the intensity of that particular industrial noise. A-weighted measurements are commonly used to determine noise levels that can cause harm to the human ear. There are also special exposure meters available that integrate noise over a period of time to give an L_{eq} value (equivalent sound pressure level), defined by standards.

=== Regulations in different countries ===
Permissible noise levels in different countries
Country	TWA, dBA (for an 8-hour shift)	Level increase corresponding to doubling the dose (Exchange rate)
Argentina	90	3
Australia	85	3
Brazil	85	5
Canada	85 & 82	3
Chile	85	5
China	70-90	3
European Union countries	85	3
Finland	85	3
France	85	3
Germany	85, 70, 55	3
Hungary	85	3
India	90	–
Israel	85	5
Italy	85	3
Netherlands	80	3
New Zealand	85	3
Norway	85, 55, 70	3
RF	80	3
Spain	85	3
Sweden	85	3
United Kingdom	85	3
USA	90 (100)*	5
Uruguay	90	3
* OSHA issued a directive to inspectors in 1983. They are ordered to stop requiring employers to install engineering noise control if noise dose < 100 dBA. This decision is considered illegal, but it is carried out in practice in most US states.

These numerical values do not fully reflect the real situation. For example, the OSHA standard sets the Action Level 85 dBA, and the PEL 90 dBA. But in practice, the Compliance Safety and Health Officer must record the excess of these values with a margin, in order to take into account the potential measurement error. And, instead of PEL 90 dBA, it turns out 92 dBA, and instead of AL 85 dBA, it's 87 dBA.

== Risks of occupational hearing loss ==
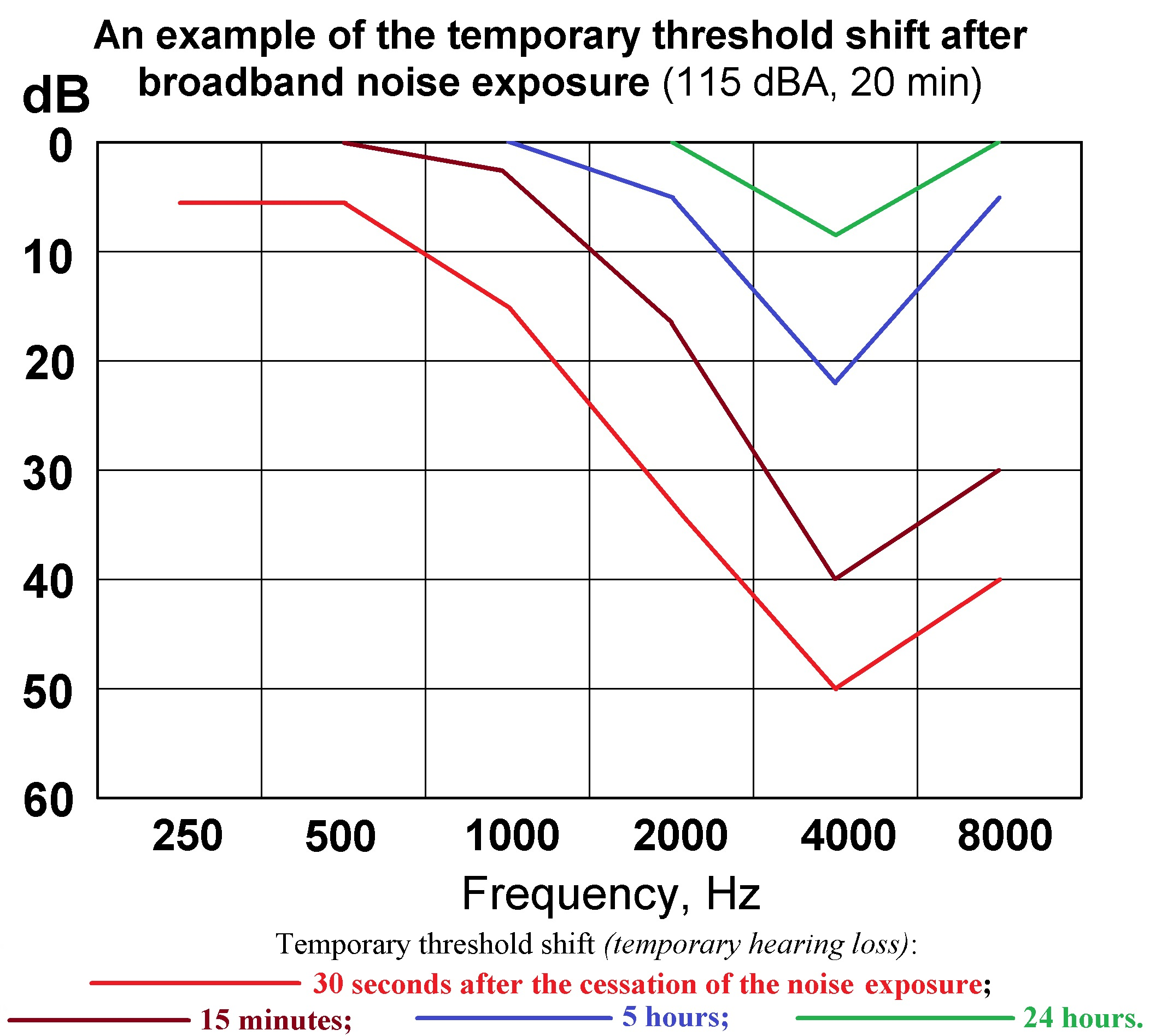
Temporary hearing loss after loud noise exposure. If such exposure is long enough, this temporary threshold shift may become permanent.

Occupational noise, if experienced repeatedly, at high intensity, for an extended period of time, can cause noise-induced hearing loss (NIHL) which is then classified as occupational hearing loss. Most often, this is a type of sensorineural hearing loss.

Noise, in the context of industrial noise, is hazardous to a person's hearing because of its loud intensity through repeated long-term exposure. In order for noise to cause hearing impairment for the worker, the noise has to be close enough, loud enough, and sustained long enough to damage the hair cells in the auditory system. These factors have been taken into account by the governing occupational health and safety organization to determine the unsafe noise exposure levels and durations for their respective industries.

Noise can also affect the safety of the employee and others. Noise can be a causal factor in work accidents as it may mask hazards and warning signals and impede concentration. High intensity noise interferes with vital workplace communication which increases the chance of accidents and decreases productivity.

Noise may also act synergistically with other hazards to increase the risk of harm to workers. In particular, toxic materials (e.g., some solvents, metals, asphyxiants and pesticides) have some ototoxic properties that may affect hearing function.

Modern thinking in occupational safety and health further identifies noise as hazardous to workers' safety and health. This hazard is experienced in various places of employment and through a variety of sources.

== Reduction ==
Hierarchy of Controls guideline

There are several ways to limit exposure to hazardous occupational noise. The hierarchy of controls is a guideline for reducing hazardous noise. Before starting a noise reduction program, base noise levels should first be recorded. After this the company can start to eliminate the noise source. If the noise source cannot be eliminated, the company must try to reduce the noise with alternative methods. This process is called acoustic quieting. Acoustic quieting is the process of making machinery quieter by damping vibrations to prevent them from reaching the observer. The company can isolate the certain piece of machinery by placing materials on the machine or in between the machine and the worker to decreases the signal intensity that reaches the worker's ear.

If elimination and substitution are not sufficient in reducing the noise exposure, engineering controls should be put in place by the employer. An engineering control usually changes the physical environment of a workplace. For noise reduction, an engineering control might be as simple as placing barriers between the noise source and the employee to disrupt the transmission path. An engineering control might also involve changing the machine that produces the noise. Ideally, most machines should be made with noise reduction in mind, but this doesn't always happen. Changing the machinery involved in an industrial process may not be possible, but is a good way to reduce the noise at its source.

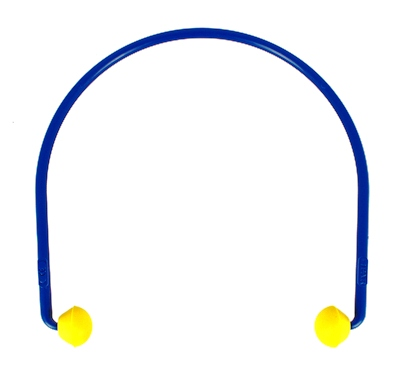
Banded ear plugs

To decrease an employee's exposure to hazardous noise, the company can also take administrative controls by limiting the employee's exposure time. This can be done by changing work shifts and switching employees out from the noise exposure area. An employer might also implement a training program so that employees can learn about the hazards of occupational noise. Other administrative controls might include restricting access to noisy areas as well as placing warning signs around those same areas.

If all other controls fail to decrease the occupational noise exposure to an acceptable level, hearing protection should be used. There are several types of earplugs that can be used to attenuate the noise to a safe level. Some earplug types include: single-use earplugs, multiple-use ear plugs, and banded ear plugs. Depending on the type of work being done and the needs of the employees, earmuffs might also be a good option. While earmuffs might not have as high of a noise reduction rating (NNR) as earplugs, they can be useful if the noise exposure isn't very high, or if an employee cannot wear earplugs. Unfortunately, the ability of hearing protection devices to decrease the risk of health damage is close to zero in practice.

== Initiatives ==
Since the hazards of occupational noise exposure were realized, programs and initiatives such as the US Buy Quiet program have been set up to regulate or discourage noise exposure. The Buy Quiet initiative promotes the purchase of quieter tools and equipment and encourages manufacturers to design quieter machines. Additionally, the Safe-In-Sound Award was created to recognize successes in hearing loss prevention programs or initiatives.

== See also ==
- Hearing conservation program
- Occupational hearing loss
- Noise-induced hearing loss
- Buy Quiet
- Earplug
- Earmuffs
- Protective clothing
- A-weighting
- ITU-R 468 noise weighting
- Weighting filter
- Equal-loudness contour
- Safe-In-Sound Award Excellence in Hearing Loss Prevention

General:

- Health effects from noise
- Noise control
- Noise pollution
- Noise regulation
