= International Noise Awareness Day =

Advocacy group that raises awareness about the harmful effects of noise

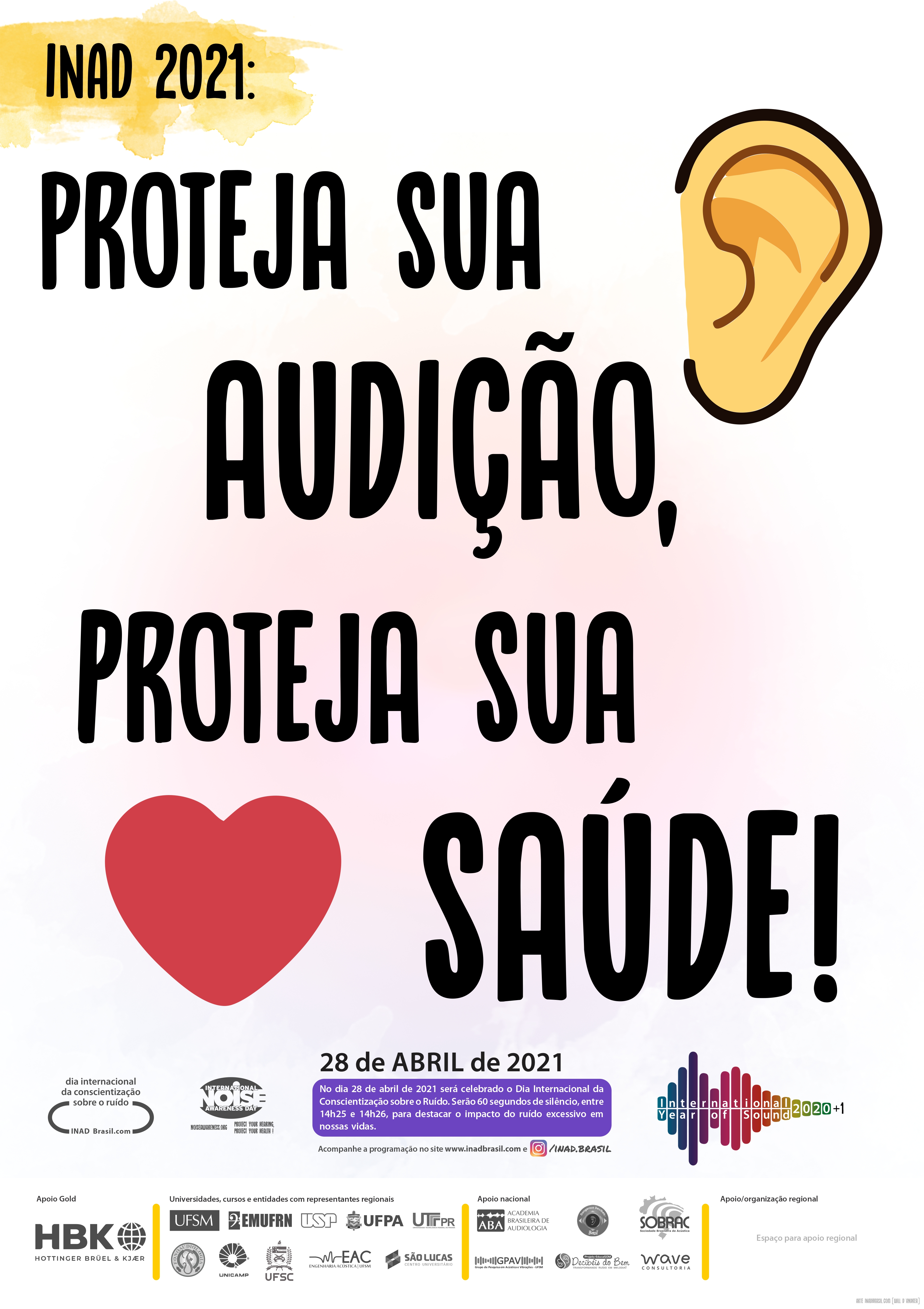

International Noise Awareness Day is a global campaign, founded in 1996 by the Center for Hearing and Communication (CHC), aiming to raise awareness of the effects of noise on the welfare and health of people. Noise affects people in many ways, but only deafness and annoyance receive actual interest from the general public. Worldwide, people are called upon to take part via various actions on this occasion: open days on hearing from acousticians, lectures in public health departments, universities and schools, panels of experts, noise level measuring actions, and readings.

The day is commemorated on the last Wednesday of April of each year. Activities aimed at creating a focus not only on noise, but also on means of reducing noise levels, are organized in a number of countries all over the world, including Brazil, Chile, Germany, Italy, Spain and the United States. In recent years, there have been related events initiated in Asia, including Singapore and Australia.

== See also ==
- Environmental noise
- Safe listening
- World Hearing Day
