= Hearing conservation program =

Hazardous noise risk prevention program

Hearing conservation programs are programs implemented to reduce the risk of hearing loss due to hazardous noise exposure, if implemented correctly. Hearing conservation programs require knowledge about risk factors such as noise and ototoxicity, hearing, hearing loss, protective measures to prevent hearing loss at home, in school, at work, in the military and, and at social/recreational events, and legislative requirements. Regarding occupational exposures to noise, a hearing conservation program is required by the Occupational Safety and Health Administration (OSHA) "whenever employee noise exposures equal or exceed an 8-hour time-weighted average sound level (TWA) of 85 decibels (dB) measured on the A scale (slow response) or, equivalently, a dose of fifty percent." This 8-hour time-weighted average is known as an exposure action value. While the Mine Safety and Health Administration (MSHA) also requires a hearing conservation program, MSHA does not require a written hearing conservation program. MSHA's hearing conservation program requirement can be found in 30 CFR § 62.150, and is very similar to the OSHA hearing conservation program requirements. Therefore, only the OSHA standard 29 CFR 1910.95 will be discussed in detail.

According to Alice Sater, employers are not implementing these programs effectively, personal protective equipment does not protect workers well, and the risk of hearing loss is not reduced.

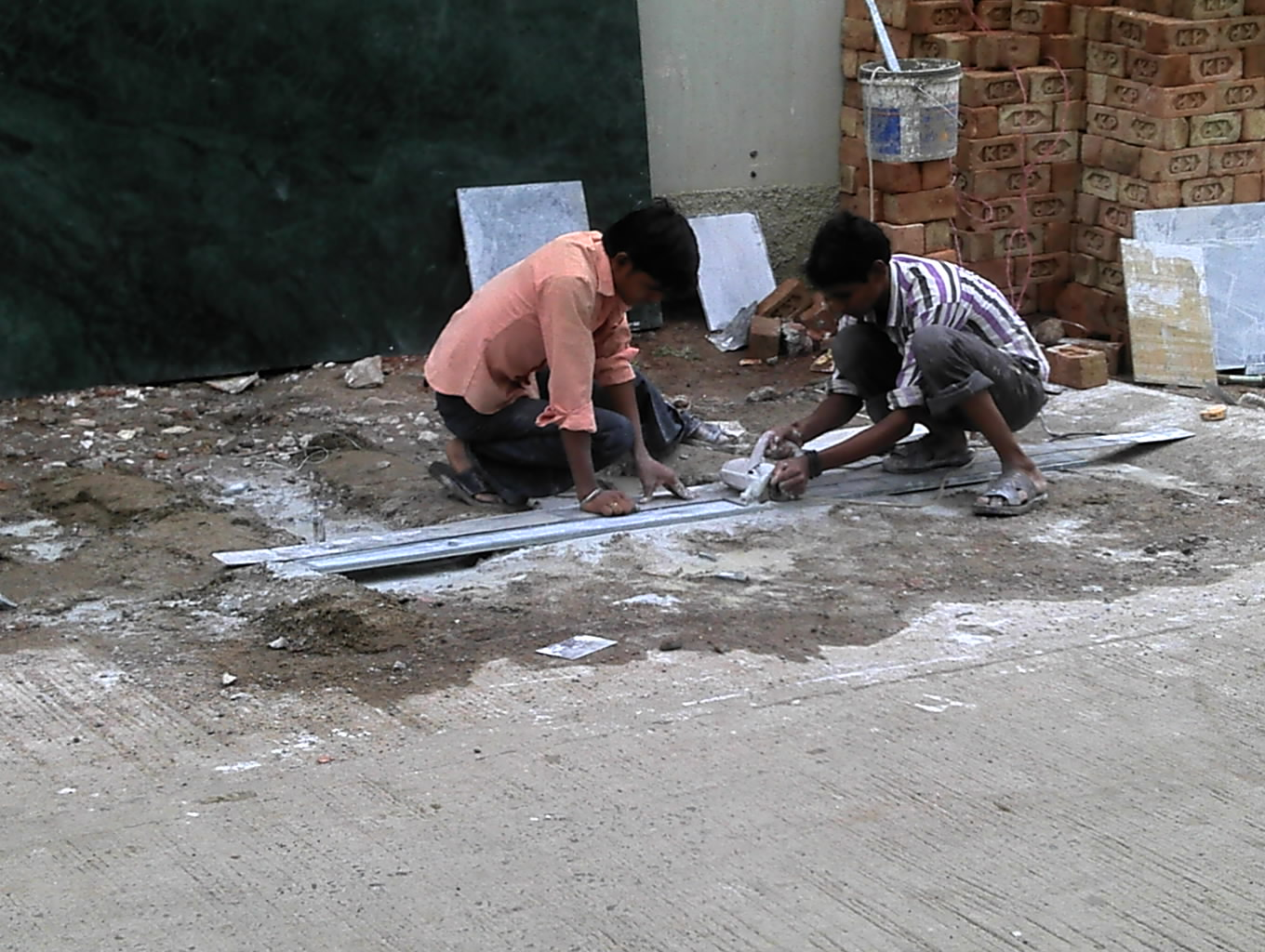
Workers cutting marble without any protective gear. Photo taken in Indore, India

== Program requirements ==
The OSHA standard contains a series of program requirements.

- Engineering Controls: 29 CFR 1910.95(b)(1) requires that "feasible administrative or engineering controls shall be utilized. If such controls fail to reduce sound levels...personal protective equipment shall be provided and used to reduce sound levels..."
- Noise Monitoring: 29 CFR 1910.95(d) requires that monitoring be conducted when "any employee's exposure may equal or exceed an 8-hour time-weighted average of 85 decibels.
- Audiometric Testing: 29 CFR 1910.95(g) requires an "audiometric testing program" for "all employees whose exposures equal or exceed an 8-hour time-weighted average of 85 decibels".
- Hearing Protectors: 29 CFR 1910.95(i) states that "employers shall make hearing protectors available to all employees exposed to an 8-hour time-weighted average of 85 decibels or greater at no cost to the employees"
- Training: 29 CFR 1910.95(k) mandates an annual "training program" for "all employees who are exposed to noise at or above an 8-hour time-weighted average of 85 decibels..." and mandates certain aspects of the training that must be included. This includes the effects of noise on hearing; purpose, advantages, disadvantages, and attenuation of different types of hearing protectors; purpose audiometric testing.
- Record Keeping: 29 CFR 1910.95(m) states that employers "shall maintain an accurate record of all employee exposure measurements..."

== Sound survey ==
A sound survey is often completed to determine areas of potential high noise exposure. A noise screening is completed initially to determine which areas are higher than 80 dB A. For these areas, an official sound survey will take place. This type of survey is normally completed using a sound level meter (SLM). A sound level meter takes a measurement of the sound present in the environment at that moment. There are three types of sound level meters. Type 0 is a precision instrument normally used in laboratories. Type 1 is for precision measurements taken in the field. Type 2 sound level meters are less precise than type 1 and are often used to take all-purpose sound level measurements. There are also noise dosimeters that are worn on the body and measure the amount of noise exposure an individual receives over a given time period. OSHA guidelines state that either a SLM or noise dosimeter may be used for sound monitoring.

Surveys must be repeated when there are significant changes in machinery and/or processes that would affect the noise level.

== Engineering and administrative controls ==
Engineering controls and administrative controls are ranked as the most effective protection from noise in the hierarchy of controls. Engineering controls are measures taken to reduce the intensity of noise at the source or between the source and a person exposed to the noise. This can be done by choosing tools that make less noise, installing a barrier between the worker and the noise, enclosing the machinery all together, or making sure the machinery is maintained properly (lubricating equipment). Administrative controls are limitations around noise sources that limit length of noise exposure. Some known methods are running loud equipment when less workers are present, controlling the amount of time a worker is allowed around the noise source, constructing areas that allow employees a chance to escape from the noise (a sound proof room to give recovery time), or increasing the distance between the worker and the excessive noise source.

== Hearing protection devices ==
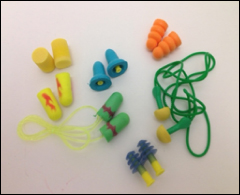
Different types of Earplugs

If engineering controls fail to maintain an 8-hour time-weighted average below 85 dBA, then a hearing protection device (HPD) is required. There are two general types of HPDs: earplugs and earmuffs. Each one has its own benefits and drawbacks. The selection of the proper HPD to be worn is commonly done by an industrial hygienist so that the proper amount of noise protection is worn. OSHA requires that HPD be given free of charge.

=== Earplugs ===
There are four general classes of earplugs. These include: pre-molded, formable, custom molded and semi-insert.

- Premolded earplugs do not require the plug to be formed before it is inserted into the ear. This prevents the plugs from becoming soiled before insertion.
- Formable earplugs are made of a variety of substances; however, all each substance shares the common feature of being able to be shaped by the user prior to insertion. One drawback of this is the obvious need for the user to have clean hands while shaping the earplug. They do have the advantage of forming to the users ear, while many premolded earplugs do not accomplish this very well.
- Custom molded ear plugs are unique for each person, since they are cast from each user's own ear canals. Therefore, they provide a personalized fit for each individual.
- Semi-inserts are generally a soft earplug on the end of band. The band aides in maintaining the earplug in position. They are often useful since they can be quickly removed and inserted.

=== Earmuffs ===
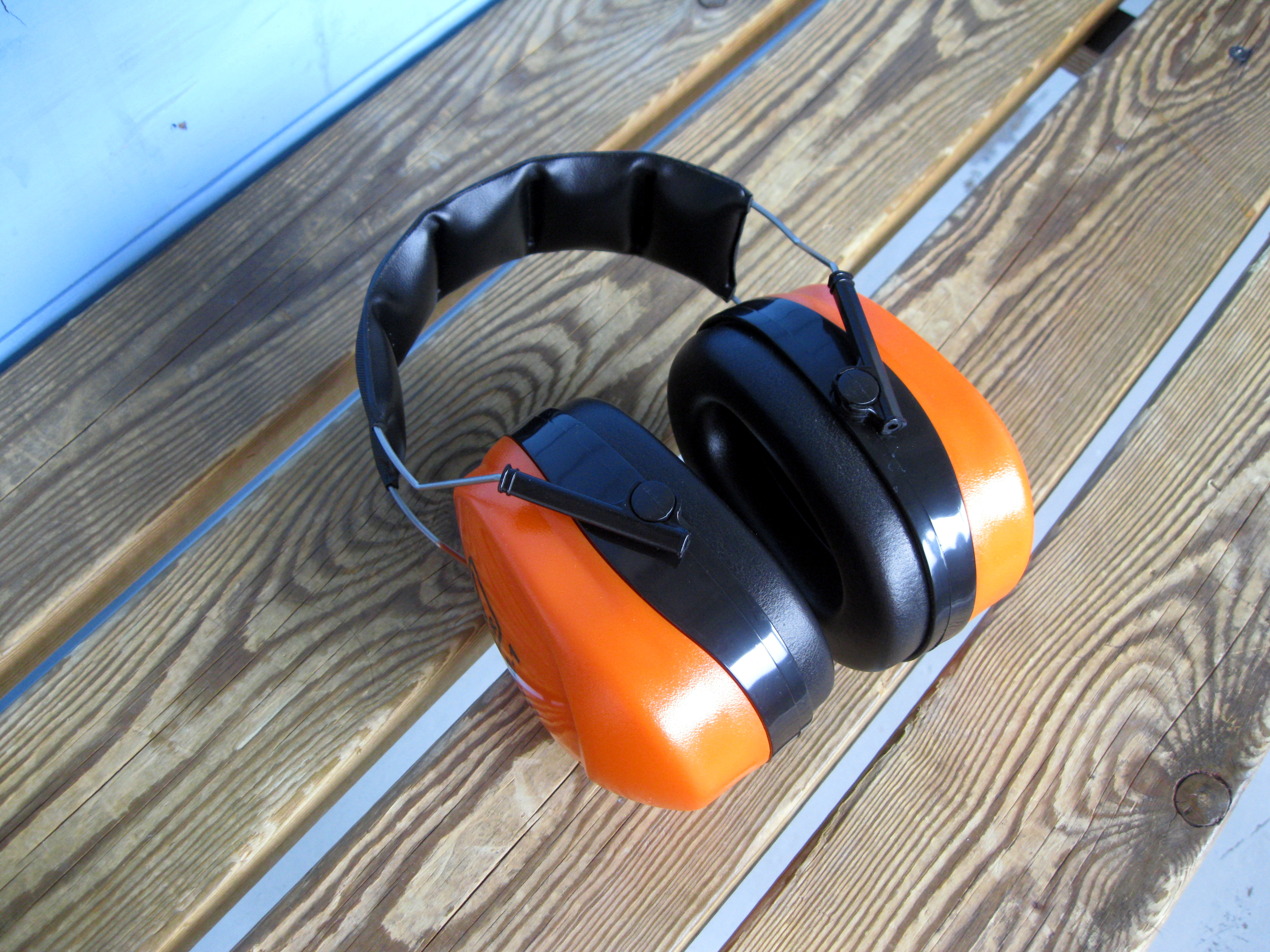
Orange safety earmuff

Earmuffs are another type of HPD. The main difference between earmuffs and earplugs, is that earmuffs are not inserted inside the ear canal. Instead the muffs create a seal around the outside of the ear to prevent noise from reaching the inner ear. Earmuffs are easy to wear and often provide a more consistent fit than an earplug. There are earmuffs available that use the principle of active noise control to help reduce noise exposures. However, the protection earmuffs offer may be mitigated by large sideburns or glasses as the seal of the earmuffs may be broken by these objects.

== Noise reduction ratings ==
The United States Environmental Protection Agency (EPA) requires that all hearing protection devices be labeled with their associated noise reduction rating (NRR). The NRR provides the estimated attenuation of the hearing protection device. The NRR obtained in the lab is often higher than the attenuation provided in the field. To determine the amount of noise reduction afforded by a hearing protection device for the A weighted scale, OSHA recommends that 7 dB be subtracted from the NRR. This new NRR should be subtracted from the individuals time weighted average (TWA) noise exposure. It must then be determined if the attenuation is appropriate for the level of noise the individual is exposed to.

There are several fit testing devices on the market that will measure the attenuation an individual receives when wearing their HPD. These systems typically use one of two methods to verify fit. The individual wears their HPD and a microphone is placed inside the ear canal and another microphone is placed outside of the ear. A sound is played and the difference between the microphones is the attenuation for that individual, known as the personal attenuation rating (PAR). In the second method, a series of sounds are played for the individual, and the lowest level that they can detect the sound is recorded. The individual then wears the HPD and the same sounds are played. The amount that the sound has to be increased so that the individual can hear it is the PAR.

== Audiometric testing program ==
Audiometric testing is used to determine hearing sensitivity and is part of a hearing conservation program. This testing is part of the hearing conservation program that is used in the identification of significant hearing loss. Audiometric testing can identify those who have permanent hearing loss. This is called noise-induced permanent threshold shift (NIPTS).

Completing baseline audiograms and periodically monitoring threshold levels is one way to track any changes in hearing and identify if there is a need to make improvements to the hearing conservation program. OSHA, which monitors workplaces in the United States to ensure safe and healthful working conditions, specifies that employees should have a baseline audiogram established within 6 months of their first exposure to 85 dBA time-weighted average (TWA). If a worker is unable to obtain a baseline audiogram within 6 months of employment, HPD is required to be worn if the worker is exposed to 85 dBA or above TWA. HPD must be worn until a baseline audiogram is obtained. Under the MSHA, which monitors compliance to standards within the mining industry, an existing audiogram that meets specific standards can be used for the employee's baseline. Before establishing baseline, it is important that the employee limit excessive noise exposure that could potentially cause a temporary threshold shift and affect results of testing. OSHA stipulates that an employee be noise-free for at least 14 hours prior to testing.

Periodic audiometric monitoring, typically completed annually as recommended by OSHA, can identify changes in hearing. There are specific criteria that the change must meet in order to require action. The criterion most commonly used is the standard threshold shift (STS), defined by a change of 10 dB or greater averaged at 2000, 3000, and 4000 Hz. Age correction factors can be applied to the change in order to compensate for hearing loss that is age-related rather than work-related. If an STS is found, OSHA requires that the employee be notified of this change within 21 days. Furthermore, any employee that is not currently wearing HPD is now required to wear protection. If the employee is already wearing protection, they should be refit with a new device and retrained on appropriate use.

Another determination that is made includes whether an STS is "recordable" under OSHA standards, meaning the workplace must report the change to OSHA. In order to be recordable the employee's new thresholds at 2000, 3000, and 4000 Hz must exceed an average of 25 dB HL. MSHA standard differs slightly in terms of calculation and terminology. MSHA considers whether an STS is "reportable" by determining if the average amount of change that occurs exceeds 25 dB HL. The various measures that are used in occupational audiometric testing allow consistency in standards within workplaces. Completing baseline and follow-up audiograms allows workplaces to detect hearing loss as early as possible and determine whether changes need to be made to provide a safe working environment for their employees.

== Employee training and education ==
Proper training and education of those exposed to noise is the key to preventing noise-induced hearing loss. If employees are properly trained on how to follow a hearing conservation program, then the risk of noise-induced hearing loss is reduced. By providing information on the physiological effects of noise exposure, the importance of obtaining baseline and annual audiograms, and use of appropriate hearing protection, the program will provide a thorough knowledge base for employees involved. Providing a refresher training when appropriate will support retention of this information. OSHA requires this training to be completed on an annual basis. Proper training is imperative since "even with a very modest amount of instruction attenuation performance can be significantly improved."

=== Resources needed to carry out a hearing conservation program ===
To carry out a hearing conservation training, the program may use a variety of materials to relay the necessary information. An assortment of written, video, audio, and hands on experience may make the training more interactive and meaningful to employees. It is recommended that materials also be translated into languages other than English so all employees can attend and benefit from the training. Pre- and post-assessments, a safe and secure learning environment, access to training media and equipment, informational handouts/pamphlets, and examples of hearing protection devices are all resources that can contribute to successful HLPP trainings.

=== Initial Training ===
The initial training for employees should cover the following topics:

- The physical and psychological effects of noise-induced hearing loss
- Recognition of hazardous noise may be possible whether it is posted or unposted
- Audiometric testing and its purpose
- The responsibilities of employees and supervisors in the hearing conservation program
- The danger of noise exposure in recreational activities
- Possible effects of hearing loss on job performance and fitness for duty

=== Factors Influencing Employee Motivation to Participate in Hearing Conservation Program ===
It is not enough to provide the employees with the information about occupational hearing loss and hearing conservation. There are many factors that may contribute to the employee's lack of compliance with training. These factors fall under three main categories: individual perceptions or beliefs, individual personality, and influencing variables.

==== Individual Perceptions ====
Every worker has perceptions about their work environment, how noise and ototoxins affect them, and hearing conservation programs. Some workers may believe that they are invulnerable to hearing loss. These workers may perceive that the noise is not loud enough to cause hearing loss. Others know that 29% of workers may have noise-induced hearing loss, meaning 71% are not likely to develop a hearing loss due to noise. Because of these statistics, some workers may believe that they will fall into the 71%. Others may believe that they are too young to suffer from hearing loss. Still others have the incorrect belief that loud noise will make the ears tougher. A portion of workers may not realize the implications of a hearing loss and that hearing aids will be able to fix their hearing. If there is not a perceived benefit to using hearing protection devices, it is less likely that individuals will participate. If workers perceive that there are barriers to taking action to prevent hearing loss, they are also less likely to participate in the program. These barriers may include hearing protection affecting their ability to perform their job well, their company being shut down due to the noise levels, hearing protector comfort, and chronic irritation and infection of the outer and middle ear.

==== Individual Personality ====
A small number of individuals may see the use of HPD as weakness or not being manly. This may arise from peer pressure.

==== Influencing Variables ====
Workers who have experienced or are currently experiencing tinnitus are more likely to use HPD consistently. Others who have had a temporary hearing loss may be triggered to motivate preventive action. Workers who have suffered from a temporary hearing threshold shift following loud noise exposure may serve as a motivation for the use of HPD. The use of HPDs is more common in companies with more complete hearing conservation programs.

=== Motivational Techniques ===
Motivational techniques can be implemented to promote hearing conservation program compliance and the use of hearing protection. One suggestion is continued education at the workers' audiometric screening. They should be asked to bring along their current hearing protection device to the screening. If the results are normal and the inspection of the hearing protection device is good, praise can be given for following protocol. If there is a shift in their hearing, instruction can be given again about the proper use of hearing protection and the importance of wearing them. Audiograms can be very useful in showing workers how noise can affect their hearing. One specific way to do this is to perform two hearing test on an employee on two different days. One day the hearing test will be after wearing hearing protection all day and the other will be after not wearing hearing protection for the day. The difference can then be discussed with the worker and he/she has a tangible way to see how noise affects hearing. Another technique is using "internal triggers" to motivate employees to comply to the hearing conservation program. If the individual already suffers from tinnitus and/or hearing loss they are probably more likely to use hearing protection because he/she does not want that problem to progress with noise exposure. Finally, the hearing protection offered should be comfortable so the worker will wear it. It is suggested that workers have a variety of hearing protection devices available to them, including at least one type of earmuff and two different forms of earplugs, to fit the individual needs and wants of the workers.

== Record keeping ==
OSHA requires that records of exposure measurements and audiometric tests be maintained. Records are also required to have the following:

- name and job classification
- date of the audiogram
- examiner's name
- calibration date
- employee's most recent noise exposure assessment
- background sound pressure levels in audiometric test booths.

Noise exposure measurement records must be maintained for at least 2 years. Audiometric test records must be retained for the duration of the affected employee's employment. Additionally, employees, former employees, representatives designated by the individual employee and the Assistant Secretary all must have access to these records.

== Program evaluation ==
Proper program evaluation is important in maintaining the health of hearing conservation program. The National Institute for Occupational Safety and Health (NIOSH) has created a checklist to help evaluate the effectiveness of a hearing conservation program. It can be found on their website. NIOSH recommends that fewer than 5% of exposed employees should have a 15 dB significant threshold shift in the same ear and same frequency. It also suggests using the term hearing loss prevention program rather than a hearing conservation program. "Conservation" implies a response by the workplace caused by initial signs of employee hearing loss, whereas "prevention" promotes policies (such as "buy quiet") and procedures (such as hearing protection training and education) to decrease the possibility of occupational hearing loss from happening in the first place.

== Best practices ==
Simply having a hearing conservation program (even a program that complies completely with relevant government regulations) is not necessarily sufficient to prevent occupational hearing loss. A 2017 Cochrane review low-quality evidence that stricter legislation might reduce noise levels. Giving workers information on their noise exposure levels by itself was not shown to decrease exposure to noise. Moderate-quality evidence indicated that training in the correct fitting of ear protection has the potential to reduce noise to safer levels in the short term, but long-term evidence on prevention of hearing loss is lacking. External solutions such as proper maintenance of equipment can lead to noise reduction, but further study of this issue under real-life conditions is needed. Other possible solutions include improved enforcement of existing legislation and better implementation of well-designed prevention programs, which have not yet been proven conclusively to be effective. Lack of evidence does not imply lack of effect; further research on the impact of generally-accepted hearing conservation practices is much needed.

In the meanwhile, many hearing conservation organizations advocate for "best practices" that go beyond mere compliance in order to more successfully prevent occupational hearing loss. Some of these are discussed below.

=== Buy Quiet ===
The Buy Quiet policy is an easy way to progress towards a safer work environment. Many traditionally noisy tools and machines are now being redesigned in order to manufacture quieter running equipment, so a "buy quiet" purchase policy should not require new engineering solutions in most cases. As a part of the "buy quiet" campaign, the New York City Department of Environmental Protection released a products and vendor guidance sheet in order to assist contractors for achieving compliance with the New York City Noise Regulations.

In order to make these plans effective, employees and administration need to be educated in occupational noise-induced hearing loss prevention. It is also necessary to identify and examine sources of noise first before being able to control the damage it may cause to hearing. For example, the National Institute for Occupational Safety and Health has conducted a study and created a database on handheld power tools for the sound power levels they expose their operators to. This Power Tools Database allows contractors in a trade-skill profession to monitor their exposure limits and allow them preparation to prevent permanent hearing damage.

=== Total Hearing Health ===
Hazardous noise exposures exist outside the workplace as well as on-the-job. Furthermore, noise can interact with other health issues, potentially impacting the severity of the noise effects and/or the related health conditions. For these reasons, taking a Total Hearing Health approach that integrates occupational hearing loss prevention activities with overall health promotion activities can reduce the adverse effects of noise both on- and off-the-job.

Total Hearing Health is based on the Total Worker Health® concept. Total Worker Health is defined as "policies, programs, and practices that integrate protection from work-related safety and health hazards with promotion of injury and illness-prevention efforts to advance worker well-being." Employers are required to protect workers from harmful working conditions; however, the Total Worker Health approach encourages organizations to address worker health and safety more broadly by establishing a comprehensive strategy to address both workplace and personal health risks as a more effective way of promoting worker health and safety.

Regardless of the kind of work people do, nearly everyone will be exposed to hazardous noise levels at some point in their lives. Reducing the public health burden of hearing loss requires addressing noise risks in a holistic manner that includes strong occupational hearing loss prevention practices as well as consideration of risk factors beyond the workplace. A comprehensive approach to hearing health can mitigate interactions between noise and other health concerns. For example, noise-induced hearing loss may impact quality of life as a person ages, while age-related hearing loss may create workplace safety issues. Some ideas for expanding hearing conservation towards a Total Hearing Health approach include:

- Encouraging workers to get to know their noise exposures both on- and off-the-job
- Making hearing protectors available for off-the-job noise exposures
- Counseling workers about hearing risks among their family members

Companies that have implemented this concept at their worksites have successfully increased employee engagement in hearing loss prevention and reduced noise levels. Browse through the winners of the Safe-In-Sound awards to read more about success stories at workplaces such as Domtar in Kinsgsport Mill, TN, 3M in Hutchinson, MN, and Northrop Grumman in Linthicum, MD.

== Hearing conservation for workers with hearing-impairment ==
=== Overview ===
There are currently no standards or regulations for workers that already have a hearing loss. OSHA provides recommendations only for addressing the needs of these employees who are exposed to high noise levels. Communication and the use of hearing protection devices with hearing aids are some of the issues that these workers face.

=== Hearing protection use ===
Hearing protection is required to protect the residual hearing of workers, even if there is a diagnosis of severe to profound deafness. Specialized hearing protectors are available:

- passive hearing protectors that supply no amplification to the users
- active hearing protectors that contain a power supply
- communication headsets

Appropriate hearing protection should be determined by the worker with the hearing-impairment, as well as the professional running the conservation program. Hearing aids that are turned off are not acceptable forms of hearing protection.

=== Hearing aid use ===
Not only do hearing aids amplify helpful sounds, but they also amplify the background noise of the environment the worker is in. These employees may want to continue to wear their amplification because of communication needs, or localization, but amplifying the noise may exceed the OSHA 8-hour permissible exposure limit (PEL) of 90 dBA. Professionals in charge of the hearing conservation program may allow workers to wear hearing aids under earmuffs on a case-by-case basis. However, when in hazardous noise, hearing aids should not be worn.

=== Audiometric testing ===
Hearing aids must be removed and audiometric testing requirements must be followed (see above). Employers should consider using manual techniques to obtain thresholds instead of a microprocessor audiometer. This is dependent on the severity of the hearing loss. Hearing aids can be worn during the testing instructions, but then should be removed immediately afterwards.

== Hearing conservation for children ==
=== Overview ===
There are not regulations to protect children from excessive noise exposure, but it is estimated that 5.2 million kids have noise-induced hearing loss (NIHL). Due to increased worry among both parents and experts regarding NIHL in children, it has been suggested that hearing conservation programs be implemented in schools as part of their studies regarding health and wellness. The necessity for these programs is supported by the following reasons: 1. Children are not sheltered from loud noises in their daily lives, and 2. Promoting healthy behaviors at a young age is critical to future application. The creation of a hearing conservation program for children will strongly differ from those created for the occupational settings discussed above. While children may not be exposed to factory of industrial noise on a daily basis, they may be exposed to noise sources such as firearms, music, power tools, sports, and noisy toys. All of these encounters with noise cumulatively increases their risk for developing Noise-induced hearing loss. With NIHL being a fully preventable ailment, providing children with this type of education has the potential to reduce future incidence of this condition. There are multiple organizations in existence that provide educators with the appropriate material to teach this topic; teachers simply need to be proactive about accessing them. Below are examples of hearing conservation programs that have been designed specifically for children.

=== Creation of Programs ===
This is the primary goal of most hearing conservation programs at the elementary, middle, and high school levels is to spread knowledge about hearing loss and noise exposure. When an educational program is being created or adapted for use with children, behavior change theories are often employed to increase effectiveness. Behavior theory identifies possible obstacles to change while also highlighting factors that may encourage students to change. The following are elements that are also considered during the implementation of a new program for children:

1. Adaptation of the program for the specific population (age, demographic, etc.)

2. Use of interactive games, lessons, and role-playing

3. Time to apply the skills that are taught

4. Reoccurring lessons on the same topic area

=== Examples of Programs & Campaigns ===
==== Dangerous Decibels ====
Dangerous Decibels is a program designed to teach concepts related to the prevention of noise-induced hearing loss. Proven to be effective for children in 4th through 7th grade, children are engaged in hands-on activities during this 50-minute presentation. The class will learn about what sound is, how their ears hear and detect it, and how they can protect their hearing from dangerous decibels. Throughout the program, the class focuses on three strategies: Turn it Down, Walk Away, and Protect your Ears.

==== Listen to your Buds ====
Created by the American Speech-Language-Hearing Association, this campaign aims to teach children and their parents about practicing safe listening routines when listening to music through personal devices, such as an iPod. With the help of sponsors, ASHA hosts an educational concert series to promote safe music listening.

==== Cheers for Ears ====
Run by the Ear Science Institute of Australia, this school program was created to educate elementary-age children on the risks of high listening levels and the effects of hearing loss. Program has a mascot named Charlie and uses sound level meters, computer games, apps, and take-home packets to teach the concepts. Teachers also receive addition activities and worksheets for continued learning opportunities.

==== It's a Noisy Planet. Protect Their Hearing. ====
Organized by the United States National Institutes of Health, this is a campaign created with the aim to increase parental awareness of both the causes and effects of noise induced hearing loss. By targeting parents instead of children, the goal is for adults to influence the behaviors of their children before bad habits are even created. Resources provided include web-based games and puzzles, downloadable graphics, and tips for school and home environments.

==== Sound Sense ====
Created by The Hearing Foundation of Canada, the Sound Sense classroom program teaches children how hearing works, how it can stop working, and offers ideas for safe listening. The classroom presentation satisfies the requirements for the science unit on sound taught in either grade 3 or 4, as well as the healthy living curriculum in grades 5 and 6. In addition, the webpage provides resources & games for children, parents, and teachers.

==== HEARsmart ====
An Australian program initiated by the HEARing Cooperative Research Centre and the National Acoustic Laboratories (NAL), HEARsmart aims to improve the hearing health of all Australians, particularly those at greatest of risk of noise-related tinnitus and hearing loss. The program has a particular focus on promoting healthy hearing habits in musicians, live music venues and patrons. Resources include: Know Your Noise - an online risk calculator and speech-in-noise test, a short video that aims to raise awareness of tinnitus in musicians, and a comprehensive website with detailed information.

=== Effectiveness & program evaluation ===
Just as program evaluation is necessary in workplace settings, it is also an important component of educational hearing conservation programs to determine if any changes need to be made. This evaluation may consist of two main parts: assessment of students' knowledge and assessment of their skills and behaviors. To examine the level of knowledge acquired by the students, a questionnaire is often given with the expectation of an 85% competency level among students. If proficiency is too low, changes should be implemented. If the knowledge level is adequate, assessing behaviors is then necessary to see if the children are using their newfound knowledge. This evaluation can be done through classroom observation of both the students and teachers in noisy classroom environments such as music, gym, technology, etc.

== Other regulatory agencies ==
The Mine Safety and Health Administration (MSHA) requires that all feasible engineering and administrative controls be employed to reduce miners' exposure levels to 90 dBA TWA. The action level for enrollment in a hearing conservation program is 85 dBA 8-hour TWA, integrating all sound levels between 80 dBA to at least 130 dBA. MSHA uses a 5-dB exchange rate (the sound level in decibels that would result in halving [if an increase in sound level] or a doubling [if a decrease.in sound level] the allowable exposure time to maintain the same noise dose). At and above exposure levels of 90 dBA TWA, the miner must wear hearing protection. At and above exposure levels above 105 dBA TWA, the miner must wear dual hearing protection. Miners may not be exposed to sounds exceeding 115 dBA with or without hearing protection devices. MSHA defines an STS as an average decrease in auditory sensitivity of 10 dB HL at the frequencies 2000, 3000, and 4000 Hz. (30 CFR Part 62).

The Federal Railroad Administration (FRA) encourages, but does not require, railroads to use administrative controls that reduce noise exposure duration when the worker exceeds 90 dBA TWA. The FRA defines the action level for employee enrollment in a hearing conservation program as an 8-hour TWA of 85 dBA on certain railroads, integrating all sound levels between 80 dBA and 140 dBA. FRA uses a 5-dB exchange rate. Those employees who are always at or above 90 dBA TWA are required to wear hearing protection such that sound levels are attenuated below 90 dBA TWA. (49 CFR Part 229).

The U.S. Department of Defense (DOD) specifies that engineering controls are preferential when reducing the noise levels at the source. The use of hearing protective devices is considered an "interim protective measure" while engineering controls are developed. The goal of these controls is to reduce ambient steady-state noise levels to 85 dBA regardless of TWA exposure and to reduce impulse noise levels to below 140 dBP. The DOD requires that personnel be entered into a hearing conservation program when continuous and intermittent noise levels ale grs greater than or equal to 85 dBA TWA, when impulse SPL are at or in excess of 140 dBP, or when the personnel is exposed to ultrasonic frequencies. The DOD integrates all sound levels between 80 dBA to a minimum of 130 dBA when determining an individual or representative noise dose. When used, hearing protectors must be capable of attenuating worker noise exposure below 85 dBA TWA. Hearing protection is required to be carried by personnel who work in designated noise areas, such as those exposed to gunfire or ordnance tests and Service musicians. The DOD defines a significant threshold shift as a 10 dB average decrease in hearing thresholds at 2000, 3000, and 4000 Hz in either ear, with no age corrections. It is further specified that a shift in 15 dB at 1000, 2000, 3000, or 4000 Hz is an early warning sign for an STS; follow-up retraining is required in this case. (DOD Instruction 6055.12).

The European Union (EU) requires a hearing conservation program be implemented when the worker exposure levels exceed 80 dBA TWA. Note that this is more strict than hearing conservation regulations in the United States. The EU specifies several different exposure action values: a "lower" value of 80 dBA at which the employer must make hearing protection devices available to the employee; an "upper" value of 85 dBA at which the employee is required to wear hearing protection; and an "exposure limit" value of 87 dBA, under which the individual's noise exposure shall be limited to preserve hearing. The directive also defines a weekly noise exposure level which is applied to individuals working in circumstances of inconstant noise exposure. Finally, the EU also recommends a variety of noise reduction methods, including administrative controls to reduce worker exposure duration, the provision of quieter equipment, and adequate maintenance of machinery and other noise sources (European Parliament and Council Directive 2003|10|EC).

== See also ==
- Hearing impairment
- Audiometry
- Exposure Action Value
- Noise-induced hearing loss
- Occupational hearing loss
- Safe-In-Sound Award
- Safe listening
- List of occupational health and safety awards
- World Hearing Day
