= Noise =

Unwanted sound

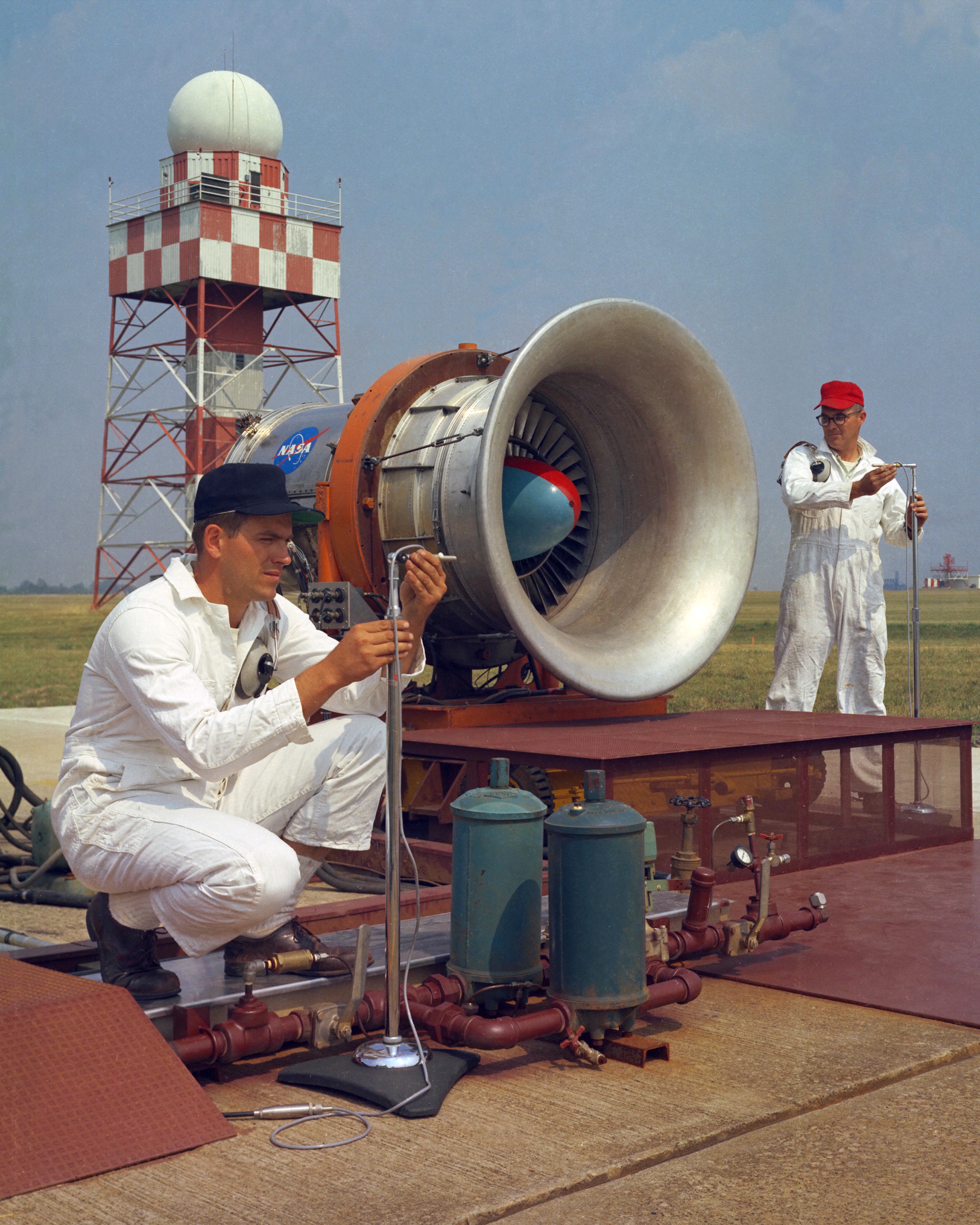
NASA researchers at Glenn Research Center measuring aircraft engine noise in 1967

Noise is sound, chiefly unwanted, unintentional, or harmful sound considered unpleasant, loud, or disruptive to mental or hearing faculties. From a physics standpoint, there is no distinction between noise and desired sound, as both are vibrations through a medium, such as air or water. The difference arises when the brain receives and perceives a sound. Acoustic noise is any sound in the acoustic domain, either deliberate (e.g., music or speech) or unintended.

Noise may also refer to a random or unintended component of an electronic signal, whose effects may not be audible to the human ear and may require instruments for detection. It can also refer to an intentionally produced random signal or spectral noise, such as white noise or pink noise.

In audio engineering, noise can refer to the unwanted residual electronic noise signal that gives rise to acoustic noise heard as a hiss. This signal noise is commonly measured using A-weighting or ITU-R 468 weighting. In experimental sciences, noise can refer to any random fluctuations of data that hinders perception of a signal.

== Measurement ==
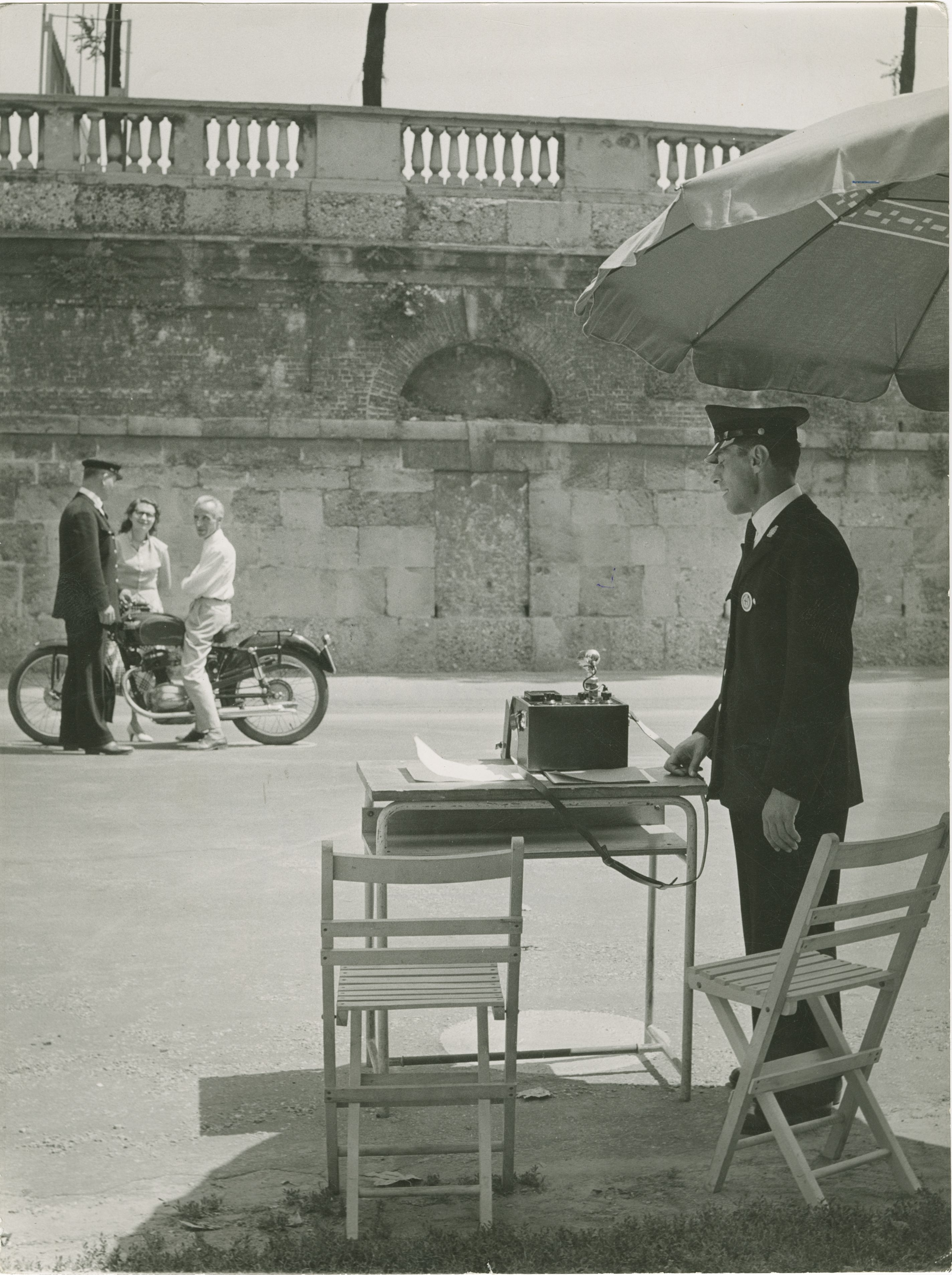
The urban police of Milan while using a noise measurement device for sound level control on city streets in 1955

Sound is measured based on the amplitude and frequency of a sound wave. Amplitude measures how forceful the wave is. The energy in a sound wave is measured in decibels (dB), the measure of loudness, or intensity of a sound; this measurement describes the amplitude of a sound wave. Decibels are expressed in a logarithmic scale. On the other hand, pitch describes the frequency of a sound and is measured in hertz (Hz).

The main instrument to measure sounds in the air is the Sound Level Meter. There are many different varieties of instruments that are used to measure noise - Noise Dosimeters are often used in occupational environments, noise monitors are used to measure environmental noise and noise pollution, and recently smartphone-based sound level meter applications (apps) are being used to crowdsource and map recreational and community noise.

A-weighting is applied to a sound spectrum to represent the sound that humans are capable of hearing at each frequency. Sound pressure is thus expressed in terms of dBA. 0 dBA is the softest level that a person can hear. Normal speaking voices are around 65 dBA. A rock concert can be about 120 dBA.

== Recording and reproduction ==
In audio, recording, and broadcast systems, audio noise refers to the residual low-level sound (four major types: hiss, rumble, crackle, and hum) that is heard in quiet periods of program. This variation from the expected pure sound or silence can be caused by the audio recording equipment, the instrument, or ambient noise in the recording room.

In audio engineering it can refer either to the acoustic noise from loudspeakers or to the unwanted residual electronic noise signal that gives rise to acoustic noise heard as hiss. This signal noise is commonly measured using A-weighting or ITU-R 468 weighting

Noise is often generated deliberately and used as a test signal for audio recording and reproduction equipment.

== Environmental noise ==
Environmental noise is the accumulation of all noise present in a specified environment. The principal sources of environmental noise are surface motor vehicles, aircraft, trains and industrial sources. These noise sources expose millions of people to noise pollution that creates not only annoyance, but also significant health consequences such as elevated incidence of hearing loss, cardiovascular disease, and many others. Urban noise is generally not of an intensity that causes hearing loss but it interrupts sleep, disturbs communication and interferes with other human activities. There are a variety of mitigation strategies and controls available to reduce sound levels including source intensity reduction, land-use planning strategies, noise barriers and sound baffles, time of day use regimens, vehicle operational controls and architectural acoustics design measures.

== Regulation ==
Certain geographic areas or specific occupations may be at a higher risk of being exposed to constantly high levels of noise; regulation may prevent negative health outcomes. Noise regulation includes statutes or guidelines relating to sound transmission established by national, state or provincial and municipal levels of government. Environmental noise is governed by laws and standards which set maximum recommended levels of noise for specific land uses, such as residential areas, areas of outstanding natural beauty, or schools. These standards usually specify measurement using a weighting filter, most often A-weighting.

=== United States ===
In 1972, the Noise Control Act was passed to promote a healthy living environment for all Americans, where noise does not pose a threat to human health. This policy's main objectives were: (1) establish coordination of research in the area of noise control, (2) establish federal standards on noise emission for commercial products, and (3) promote public awareness about noise emission and reduction.

The Quiet Communities Act of 1978 promotes noise control programs at the state and local level and developed a research program on noise control. Both laws authorized the Environmental Protection Agency to study the effects of noise and evaluate regulations regarding noise control.

The National Institute for Occupational Safety and Health (NIOSH) provides recommendation on noise exposure in the workplace. In 1972 (revised in 1998), NIOSH published a document outlining recommended standards relating to the occupational exposure to noise, with the purpose of reducing the risk of developing permanent hearing loss related to exposure at work. This publication set the recommended exposure limit (REL) of noise in an occupation setting to 85 dBA for 8 hours using a 3-dB exchange rate (every 3-dB increase in level, duration of exposure should be cut in half, i.e., 88 dBA for 4 hours, 91 dBA for 2 hours, 94 dBA for 1 hour, etc.). However, in 1973 the Occupational Safety and Health Administration (OSHA) maintained the requirement of an 8-hour average of 90 dBA. The following year, OSHA required employers to provide a hearing conservation program to workers exposed to 85 dBA average 8-hour workdays.

=== Europe ===
The European Environment Agency regulates noise control and surveillance within the European Union. The Environmental Noise Directive was set to determine levels of noise exposure, increase public access to information regarding environmental noise, and reduce environmental noise. Additionally, in the European Union, underwater noise is a pollutant according to the Marine Strategy Framework Directive (MSFD). The MSFD requires EU Member States to achieve or maintain Good Environmental Status, meaning that the "introduction of energy, including underwater noise, is at levels that do not adversely affect the marine environment".

== Health effects ==
More than a quarter of US residences have average outside noise levels exceeding the maximum nighttime outside noise level recommended by the World Health Organization.

Exposure to noise is associated with several negative health outcomes. Depending on duration and level of exposure, noise may cause or increase the likelihood of hearing loss, high blood pressure, ischemic heart disease, sleep disturbances, injuries, and even decreased school performance. When noise is prolonged, the body's stress responses can be triggered; which can include increased heartbeat, and rapid breathing. There are also causal relationships between noise and psychological effects such as annoyance, psychiatric disorders, and effects on psychosocial well-being.

Noise exposure has increasingly been identified as a public health issue, especially in an occupational setting, as demonstrated with the creation of NIOSH's Noise and Hearing Loss Prevention program. Noise has also proven to be an occupational hazard, as it is the most common work-related pollutant. Noise-induced hearing loss, when associated with noise exposure at the workplace is also called occupational hearing loss. For example, some occupational studies have shown a relation between those who are regularly exposed to noise above 85 decibels to have higher blood pressure than those who are not exposed.

=== Hearing loss prevention ===
While noise-induced hearing loss is permanent, it is also preventable. Particularly in the workplace, regulations may exist limiting permissible exposure limit to noise. This can be especially important for professionals working in settings with consistent exposure to loud sounds, such as musicians, music teachers and audio engineers. Examples of measures taken to prevent noise-induced hearing loss in the workplace include engineering noise control, the Buy-Quiet initiative, creation of the Safe-In-Sound award, and noise surveillance.

OSHA requires the use of hearing protection. But the HPD (without individual selection, training and fit testing) does not significantly reduce the risk of hearing loss. For example, one study covered more than 19 thousand workers, some of whom usually used hearing protective devices, and some did not use them at all. There was no statistically significant difference in the risk of noise-induced hearing loss.

== Literary views ==
Roland Barthes distinguishes between physiological noise, which is merely heard, and psychological noise, which is actively listened to. Physiological noise is felt subconsciously as the vibrations of the noise (sound) waves physically interact with the body while psychological noise is perceived as our conscious awareness shifts its attention to that noise.

Luigi Russolo, one of the first composers of noise music, wrote the essay The Art of Noises. He argued that any kind of noise could be used as music, as audiences become more familiar with noises caused by technological advancements; noise has become so prominent that pure sound no longer exists.

Avant-garde composer Henry Cowell claimed that technological advancements have reduced unwanted noises from machines, but have not managed so far to eliminate them.

Felix Urban sees noise as a result of cultural circumstances. In his comparative study on sound and noise in cities, he points out that noise regulations are only one indicator of what is considered as harmful. It is the way in which people live and behave (acoustically) that determines the way how sounds are perceived.

== See also ==
- Association of Noise Consultants
- Background noise
- Colors of noise
- Impulse noise (acoustics)
- International Noise Awareness Day
- Intonarumori
- Human auditory ecology
- Loud music
- Noise and vibration on maritime vessels
- Noise control
- Noise in music
- Noise music
- Noise pollution
- Noise reduction
- Silence
- Sound level meter
- Soundscape
- The Hum
- White noise
