= NIOSH Power Tools Database =

National Institute for Occupational Safety and Health

Agency overview
- Formed: December 29, 1970; 55 years ago
- Jurisdiction: Federal government of the United States
- Headquarters: Washington, D.C.
- Employees: ~1,200
- Agency executive: John Howard, Director
- Parent department: Centers for Disease Control and Prevention
- Parent agency: Department of Health and Human Services
- Website: cdc.gov/niosh/

The NIOSH Power Tools Database contains sound power levels, sound pressure levels, and vibrations data for a variety of common power tools that have been tested by researchers. Data are collected for both the unloaded and loaded use of power tools. The database was created by the National Institute for Occupational Safety and Health (NIOSH).

== Purpose ==
This database was created in order to provide information to the general public about the sound and vibrations generated by power tools during their use. Many of these tools produce sound levels high enough to damage hearing if precautions are not taken. Since this information was not readily available in most cases, NIOSH created the Power Tools Database and ran tests on power tools to provide the information. According to NIOSH, the Power Tools Database "is particularly helpful in determining the 'real-world' noise level of power tools as they are used on the job." The database is a part of the much larger Hearing Loss Prevention Research Program conducted by NIOSH. The Hearing Loss Prevention Research Program is designed to reduce occupational hearing loss through research and the application of the research to real-world situations. This database advances this goal by informing buyers and users of power tools of the dangerous levels of noise and vibrations that they are exposed to while using the tools. By making people aware of how loud power tools actually are, NIOSH is attempting to encourage the design and production of quieter power tools and the proper use of hearing protectors when using such tools. The database is also part of a larger NIOSH prevention initiative called Buy Quiet. In recent years, Buy Quiet programs and initiatives have arisen in an effort to combat occupational noise exposures. These programs promote the purchase of quieter tools and equipment.

Noise-induced hearing loss (NIHL) is an increasingly common disorder often caused by work-related activities. Construction, manufacturing, and mining are some of the most susceptible occupations to NIHL, since many workers in these fields are exposed to high levels of noise on a daily basis. A substantial part of this noise results from the use of power tools, which can produce dangerous levels of noise by themselves. Although the loudness of power tools may be quite apparent to those using them, the actual level of noise produced was mostly unreported and not available easily in an online reference. This database provides detailed information about these noise levels so that appropriate action may be taken to protect workers from them.

== Method of testing ==
The information in the database originates from testing done on power tools by NIOSH researchers. Testing is conducted in accordance with ISO 3744 and ANSI S12.15. Calibration of testing equipment is performed before tests begin. Tests are conducted in a semi-anechoic chamber with a test setup that includes a ten-microphone array and an accelerometer. In the case of testing power tools in the unloaded condition, the tool is suspended by cables and set to operate at full speed. For the loaded condition, the tool is used by a researcher to perform the task for which it was designed while another researcher runs the data acquisition programs. After data are collected, they are verified and analyzed before being entered into the NIOSH Power Tools Database.

== Scope ==
Currently, the NIOSH Power Tools Database contains sound and vibrations data for 166 power tools, including 11 different types of tools from 18 manufacturers. Testing on additional power tools is in progress and the database will be updated to reflect new data acquired. The database is part of NIOSH's Buy Quiet efforts aimed at helping companies buy less noisy equipment that will result in less hearing loss. Other online resources include the "Practical Guide," a noise meter showing the length of time when exposure to various everyday noises becomes hazardous, and employee training videos.
