= Safe-in-Sound Award =

Occupational health and safety award

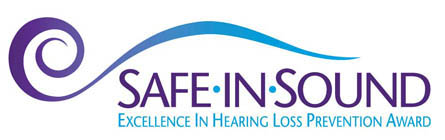
Logo, Safe-in-Sound Excellence in Hearing Loss Prevention Award

The Safe-in-Sound Excellence in Hearing Loss Prevention Award is an occupational health and safety award that was established in 2007 through a partnership between the National Institute for Occupational Safety and Health (NIOSH) and the National Hearing Conservation Association (NHCA). In 2018, the partnership was extended to include the Council for Accreditation in Occupational Hearing Conservation (CAOHC).

This award recognizes organizations that demonstrate measurable achievements towards noise control and hearing loss prevention in the workplace. Noise-induced hearing loss is a prevalent work related illness and case studies show that substantial reductions in noise levels in the workplace can be achieved. There is low quality evidence to show that implementation of stricter legislation can reduce noise levels in workplaces and moderate quality evidence that training in the proper insertion of ear plugs significantly reduces noise exposure but controlled studies and long term follow-up studies are lacking.

This award disseminates information of effective practices to a broader occupational safety and health community to encourage the adoption of evidence based hearing loss prevention. The winner, chosen by an expert committee, must incorporate evidence of effectiveness and familiar benchmarks of hearing loss prevention. The focus of this effort is documenting and highlighting effective interventions for the prevention of the negative effects of noise exposure and not regulatory compliance.

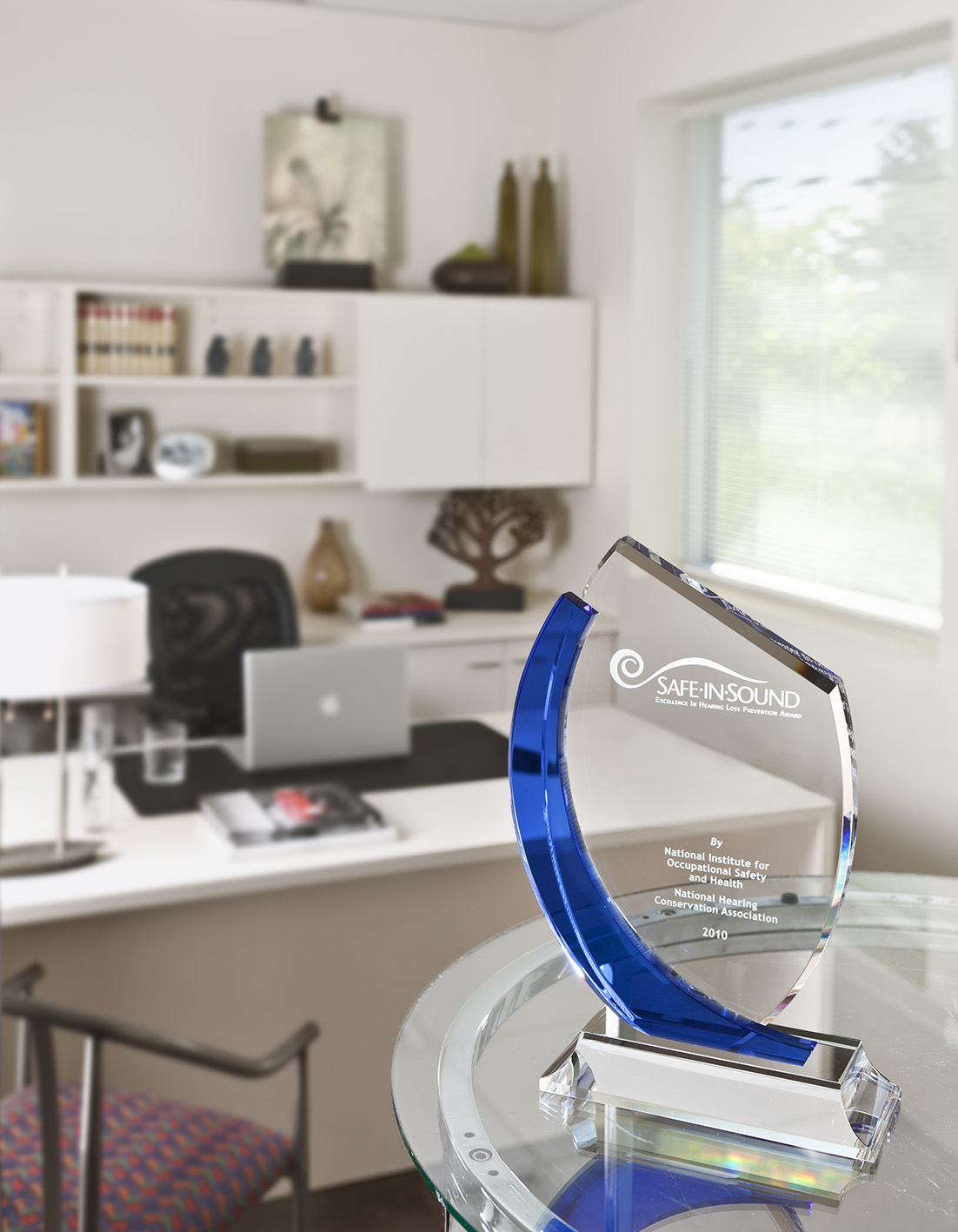
Award presented, with name of the winner engraved. Winners also receive support to attend the Annual Hearing Conservation Conference, hosted by the National Hearing Conservation Association.

The Safe-in-Sound Awards are presented every year at the NHCA Conference. The inaugural awards were presented in 2009 and recipients included Pratt & Whitney and Domtar Paper Company for the manufacturing sector, Montgomery County Water Services (Ohio) for the services sector, and Sensaphonics Hearing Conservation, Inc. Several of the award recipients have reported that noise control is a cost-effective primary preventive strategy, and that their results encouraged them to expand the adoption and implementation of noise control alternatives. Such approaches include "Buy-Quiet" and "Quiet-by-Design" initiatives. These are programs guiding purchasers to compare the noise emission levels of different models of equipment, and whenever possible, select the quieter model.

== Categories ==
There are two main categories of Safe-in-Sound Awards: the Excellence Award and the Innovation Award.

=== Excellence Award ===
The Safe-in-Sound Excellence in Hearing Loss Prevention Award is meant to recognize effective hearing loss prevention implementations in the workplace. This award was initially divided into three possible awards based on the sector the project is working with: construction, manufacturing, and service. In 2016, applications for the award started to be accepted from all industrial sectors.

=== Innovation Award ===
The Safe-in-Sound Innovation in Hearing Loss Prevention Award may be awarded to individuals or organizations that address challenges in workplace hearing loss prevention in an innovative way. Consideration for this award may include advancements in the areas of policy, program development/implementation, and outreach.

== Notable recipients ==
- 2012 (Excellence): Colgate-Palmolive, for interventions such as an online training in noise control engineering, and company-wide implementation of the NIOSH recommended 85-dBA limit for 8-hour noise exposure. In 2013, the Occupational Safety and Health Administration (OSHA) highlighted this particular Safe-in-Sound recipient in their OSHA Technical Manual (OTM), which provides information and guidance on workplace hazards.
- 2014 (Excellence): Northrop Grumman Systems Corporation, Linthicum, Maryland. This facility has implemented a process to identify and effectively control hazardous noise sources that have reduced or eliminated individual worker daily noise exposures and the need for most of their workers to be enrolled in a hearing loss prevention program.
- 2015 (Excellence): United Technologies Corporation (UTC), for reducing the exposure of their employees to hazardous chemicals and industrial noise.
- 2016 (Excellence): 3M Alexandria plant, for their reduction of noise exposure within their facility (12-14 dBA across 24 departments). The initiatives implemented by 3M proved to be cost-effective, utilized Buy-Quiet principles, and resulted in 199 of 203 no longer being required to complete the 3M Alexandria Hearing Conservation Program.
- 2020 (Innovation): 2020 Multilateral Medical Operations Panel's Acoustics Sub-Working Group for the International Space Station (ISS). The Acoustics Sub-Working Group work with the astronauts to monitor noise levels on the Space Station, identify noisy tasks or equipment for their Noise Hazard Inventory, test equipment for noise levels before it is sent to the ship, develop and implement solutions to reduce noise levels, recommends hearing protective devices to reduce crew noise exposures and perform audiometric testing before, during (on-orbit) and after flights.
- 2022 (Innovation): Michael Lawrence and Jamie Anderson, Rational Acoustics LLC. Rational Acoustics LLC develops, distributes, and supports audio measurement software for the worldwide professional sound industry. They have addressed the risks of overexposures to music experienced by live sound mixers, event crew and attendees of concerts. Their efforts contributed to the 2022 World Hearing Day theme, "To hear for life, listen with care!" World Hearing Day is hosted by the World Health Organization (WHO) and celebrated each year on March 3.
- 2022 (Excellence): Northrop Grumman, St. Augustine site. At this site, Northrop Grumman conducts ongoing noise monitoring; implements noise controls; adopts buy-quiet strategies in the purchase of new equipment and tools; provides several alternatives of hearing protection devices and hearing protection fit-testing with accompanying individual, periodic training; provides state-of-the art communication-enhanced electronic hearing protection devices; analyzes pure tone audiometry results aiming to identify early changes, and finally; continuously improving their training to ensure relevance. Employees at all levels are engaged in the initiatives.

== See also ==
- Buy Quiet
- List of occupational health and safety awards
- Health effects from noise
- Occupational hearing loss
- Hearing Conservation
- Occupational noise
- World Hearing Day
