= Safe listening =

Avoiding hearing damage from intentionally heard sounds

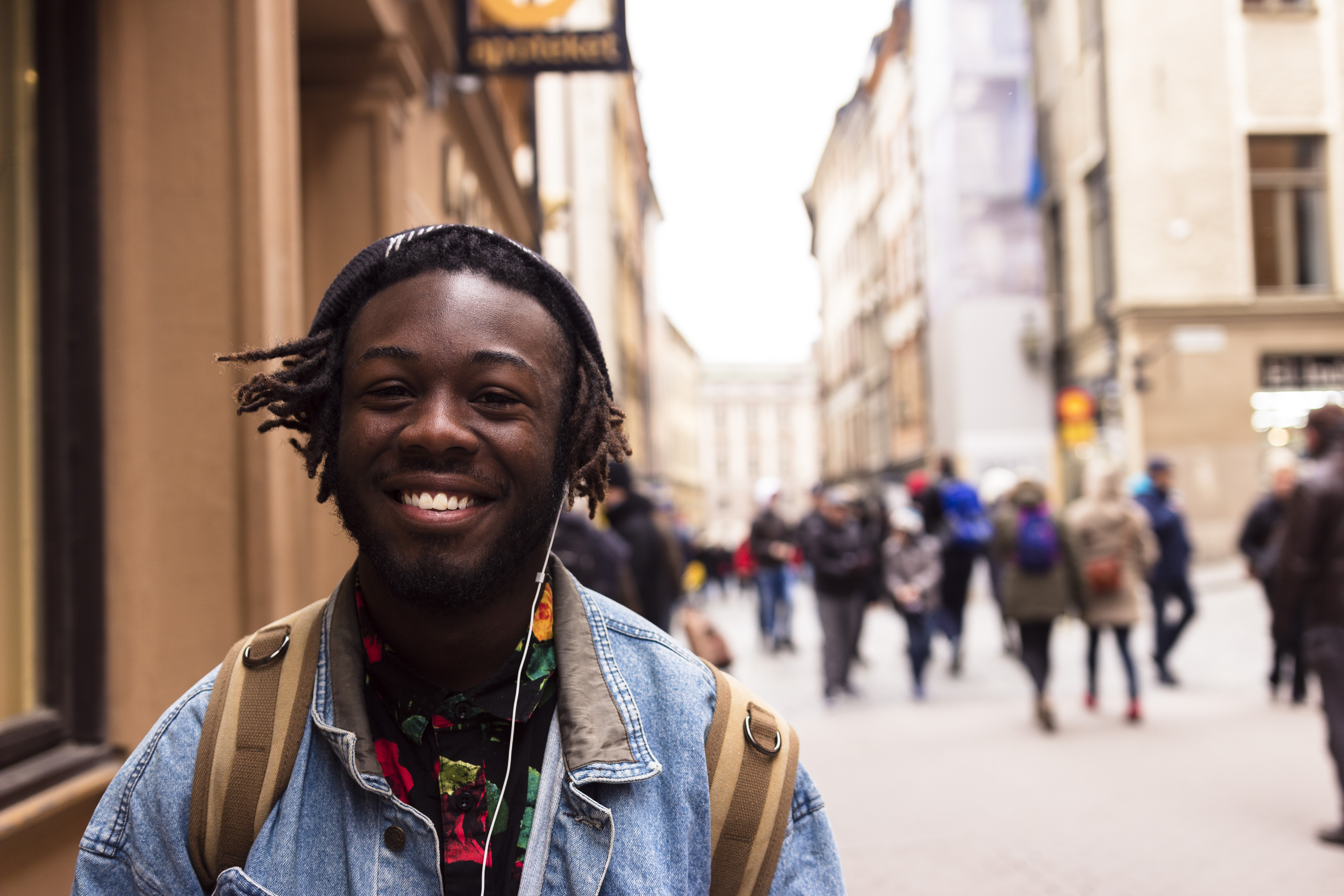
Man listening through headphones

Safe listening is a framework for health promotion actions to ensure that sound-related recreational activities (such as concerts, nightclubs, and listening to music, broadcasts, or podcasts) do not pose a risk to hearing.

While research shows that repeated exposures to any loud sounds can cause hearing disorders and other health effects, safe listening applies specifically to voluntary listening through personal listening systems, personal sound amplification products (PSAPs), or at entertainment venues and events. Safe listening promotes strategies to prevent negative effects, including hearing loss, tinnitus, and hyperacusis. While safe listening does not address exposure to unwanted sounds (which are termed noise) – for example, at work or from other noisy hobbies – it is an essential part of a comprehensive approach to total hearing health.

The risk of negative health effects from sound exposures (be it noise or music) is primarily determined by the intensity of the sound (loudness), duration of the event, and frequency of that exposure. These three factors characterize the overall sound energy level that reaches a person's ears and can be used to calculate a noise dose. They have been used to determine the limits of noise exposure in the workplace.

Both regulatory and recommended limits for noise exposure were developed from hearing and noise data obtained in occupational settings, where exposure to loud sounds is frequent and can last for decades. Although specific regulations vary across the world, most workplace best practices consider 85 decibels (dB A-weighted) averaged over eight hours per day as the highest safe exposure level for a 40-year lifetime. Using an exchange rate, typically 3 dB, allowable listening time is halved as the sound level increases by the selected rate. For example, a sound level as high as 100 dBA can be safely listened to for only 15 minutes each day.

Because of their availability, occupational data have been adapted to determine damage-risk criteria for sound exposures outside of work. In 1974, the US Environmental Protection Agency recommended a 24-hour exposure limit of 70 dBA, taking into account the lack of a "rest period" for the ears when exposures are averaged over 24 hours and can occur every day of the year (workplace exposure limits assume 16 hours of quiet between shifts and two days a week off). In 1995, the World Health Organization (WHO) similarly concluded that 24-hour average exposures at or below 70 dBA pose a negligible risk for hearing loss over a lifetime. Following reports on hearing disorders from listening to music, additional recommendations and interventions to prevent adverse effects from sound-related recreational activities appear necessary.

== Public health and community interventions ==
Several organizations have developed initiatives to promote safe listening habits. The U.S. National Institute on Deafness and Other Communication Disorders (NIDCD) has guidelines for safely listening to personal music players geared toward the "tween" population (children aged 9–13 years). The Dangerous Decibels program promotes the use of "Jolene" mannequins to measure output of PLSs as an educational tool to raise awareness of overexposure to sound through personal listening. This type of mannequin is simple and inexpensive to construct and is often an attention-grabber at schools, health fairs, clinic waiting rooms, etc.

The National Acoustic Laboratories (NAL), the research division of Hearing Australia, developed the Know Your Noise initiative, funded by the Australian Government Department of Health. The Know Your Noise website has a Noise Risk Calculator that makes it possible and easy for users to identify and understand their levels of noise exposure (at work and play), and possible risks of hearing damage. Users can also take an online hearing test to see how well they hear in a noisy background.

The WHO launched the Make Listening Safe initiative as part of the celebration of World Hearing Day on 3 March 2015. The initiative's main goal is to ensure that people of all ages can enjoy listening to music and other audio media in a manner that does not create a hearing risk. Noise-induced hearing loss, hyperacusis, and tinnitus have been associated with the frequent use at high volume of devices such as headphones, headsets, earpieces, earbuds, and True Wireless Stereo technologies of any type.

Make Listening Safe aims to:

- raise awareness about safe listening practices, especially among the younger population;
- highlight the benefits of safe listening to policy-makers, health professionals, manufacturers, parents, and others;
- foster the development and implementation of standards applicable to personal audio devices and recreational venues to cover safe listening features
- become a depository of open-access resources and information on safe listening practices in at least six languages (Arabic, Chinese, English, French, Russian, and Spanish).

In 2019 the World Health Organization published a toolkit for safe listening devices and systems that provides the rationale for the proposed strategies, and identifies actions that governments, industry partners and the civil society can take.

On 1 November 2023 the WHO launched a Make Listening Safe Campaign (MLSC) in the United Kingdom as a pilot to a strategy to encourage the adoption of safe listening practices amongst those between the ages of ten and forty. The MLSC UK will run a sequence of run short campaigns focused on different themes, starting with avoidable risks amongst headphone users. It will include an ePetition requesting the government to adopt higher hearing safeguarding standards/regulations in line with the WHO/International Telecommunication Union (ITU) recommendations. The plan is to evaluate the effort and later roll it out to its other 193 member states. It includes an in-person launch event, public education focused campaigns, policy advocacy, and collaboration with various stakeholders, including governmental bodies, industry players, and healthcare professionals.

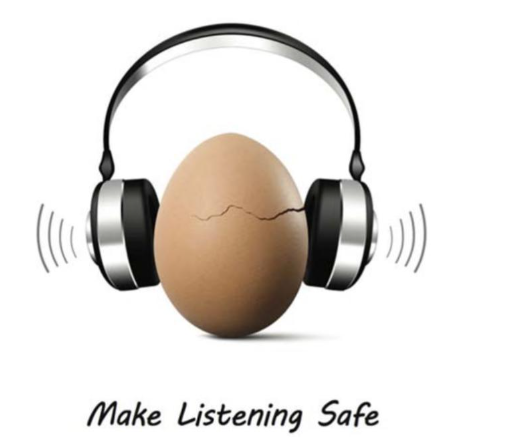
The logo for the Make Listening Safe initiative of the World Health Organization

Make Listening Safe is promoting the development of features in PLS to raise the users' awareness of risky listening practices. In this context, the WHO partnered with the International Telecommunication Union (ITU) to develop suitable exposure limits for inclusion in the voluntary H.870 safety standards on "Guidelines for safe listening devices/systems." Experts in the fields of audiology, otology, public health, epidemiology, acoustics, and sound engineering, as well as professional organizations, standardization organizations, manufacturers, and users are collaborating on this effort.

The Make Listening Safe initiative also covers entertainment venues. Average sound pressure levels (SPL) in nightclubs, discotheques, bars, gyms and live sports venues can be as high as 112 dB (A-weighted); sound levels at pop concerts may be even higher. Frequent exposure or even a short exposure to very high-sound pressure levels such as these can be harmful. WHO reviewed existing noise regulations for various entertainment sites – including clubs, bars, concert venues, and sporting arenas in countries around the world, and released a global Standard for Safe Listening Venues and Events as part of World Hearing Day 2022. Also released in 2022 were:

- an mSafeListening handbook, on how to create an mHealth safe listening program.
- and a media toolkit for journalists containing key information and how to talk about safe listening.

== Sound source interventions ==
=== Personal listening systems (PLS) ===
Personal listening systems are portable devices – usually an electronic player attached to headphones or earphones – which are designed for listening to various media, such as music or gaming. The output of such systems varies widely. Maximum output levels vary depending upon the specific devices and regional regulatory requirements. Typically, PLS users can choose to limit the volume between 75 and 105 dB SPL. The ITU and the WHO recommend that PLS be programmed with a monitoring function that sets a weekly sound exposure limit and provides alerts as users reach 100% of their weekly sound allowance. If users acknowledge the alert, they can choose to whether or not to reduce the volume. But if the user does not acknowledge the alert, the device will automatically reduce the volume to a predetermined level (based on the mode selected, i.e. 80 or 75 dBA). By conveying exposure information in a way that can be easily understood by end-users, this recommendation aims to make it easier for listeners to manage their exposures and avoid any negative effects. The health app on iPhones, Apple Watches, and iPads incorporated this approach starting in 2019. These feature the opt-in Apple Hearing Study, part of the Research app that is being conducted in collaboration with the University of Michigan School of Public Health. Data is being shared with the WHO's Make Listening Safe initiative. Preliminary results released in March 2021, one year into the study, indicated that 25% of participants experienced ringing in their ears a few times a week or more, 20% of participants have hearing loss, and 10% have characteristics that are typical in cases of noise-induced hearing loss. Nearly 50% of participants reported that they had not had their hearing tested in at least 10 years. In terms of exposure levels, 25% of the participants experienced high environmental sound exposures.

The International Technical Commission (ITC) published the first European standard IEC 62368–1 on personal audio systems in 2010. It defined safe output levels for PLSs as 85 dB or less, while allowing users to increase the volume to a maximum of 100 dBA. However, when users raise the volume to the maximum level, the standard specifies that an alert should pop up to warn the listener of the potential for hearing problems.

The 2018 ITU and WHO standard H.870 "Guidelines for safe listening devices/systems" focus on the management of weekly sound-dose exposure. This standard was based on the EN 50332-3 standard "Sound system equipment: headphones and earphones associated with personal music players – maximum sound pressure level measurement methodology – Part 3: measurement method for sound dose management." This standard defines a safe listening limit as a weekly sound dose equivalent to 80 dBA for 40 hours/week.

==== Potential differences in children ====
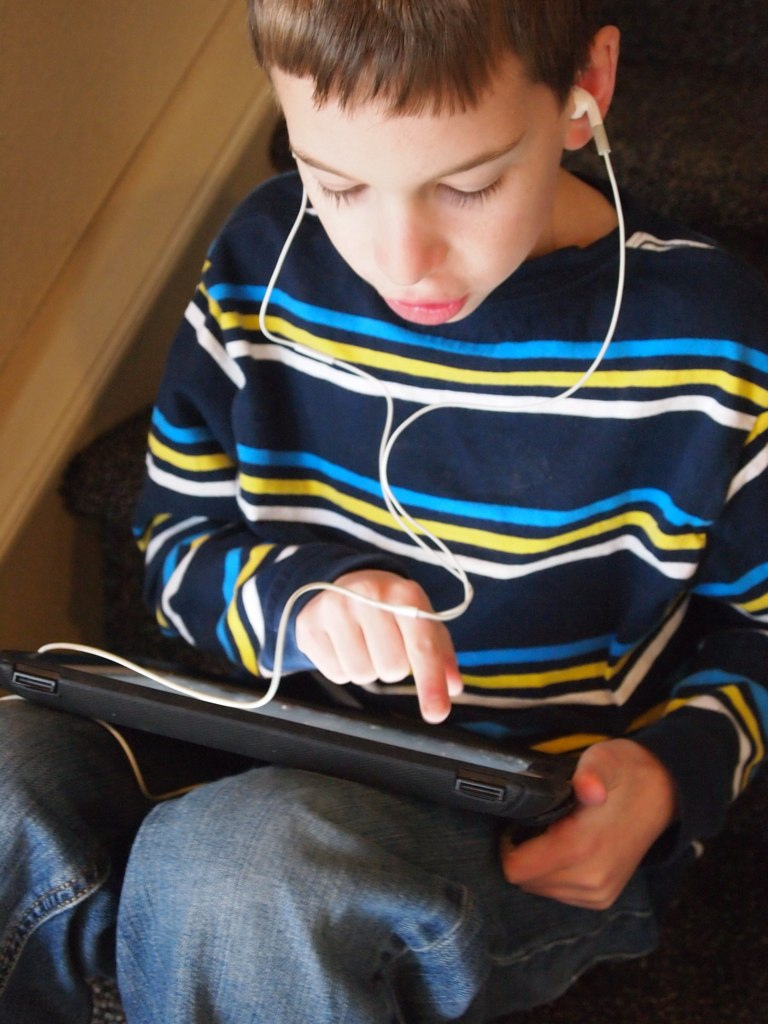
Elementary school boy with headphones

The frequent use of PLS among children has raised concerns about the potential risks that might be associated with such exposure. A systematic review and meta-analysis published in 2022 recorded an increased prevalence of risk of hearing loss compared to 2015 estimates among young people between 12 and 34 years of age who are exposed to high sound pressure levels (SPL) due to use of headphones and entertainment soundscapes. The authors included articles published between 2000 and 2021 that reported unsafe listening practices. The number of young people who may be at risk of hearing loss worldwide has been estimated from the total global estimates of the population aged 12 to 34 years. Thirty-three studies (corresponding to data from 35 medical records and 19,046 individuals) were included; 17 and 18 records focused on the use of SEPs and noisy entertainment venues, respectively. The pooled prevalence estimate of exposure to unsafe listening to EPS was 23.81% (95% CI 18.99% to 29.42%). The model was adjusted according to the intensity and duration of exposure to identify an estimated prevalence of 48.2%. The estimated global number of young people who may be at risk of hearing loss due to exposure to unsafe listening practices ranged from 0.67 to 1.35 billion. The authors concluded that unsafe listening practices are highly prevalent worldwide and may put over 1 billion young people at risk of hearing loss.

There is no agreement on the acceptable risk of noise-induced hearing loss in children; and adult damage-risk criteria may not be suitable for establishing safe listening levels for children due to differences in physiology and the more serious developmental impact of hearing loss early in life. One attempt to identify safe levels assumed that the most appropriate exposure limit for recreational noise exposure in children would aim to protect 99% of children from a shift in hearing exceeding 5 dB at 4 kHz after 18 years of noise exposure. Using estimates from the International Organization for Standardization (ISO 1999:2013), the authors calculated that 99% of children who are exposed from birth until the age of 18 years to 8-h average sound levels (LEX) of 82 dBA would have hearing thresholds of about 4.2 dB greater, indicating a shift in hearing ability. By including a 2 dBA margin of safety which reduces the 8-hr exposure allowance to 80 dBA, the study estimated a hearing change of 2.1 dB or less in 99% of children. To preserve the hearing from birth until the age of 18 years, it was recommended that noise exposures be limited to 75 dBA over a 24-hour period. Other researchers recommended that the weekly sound dose be limited to the equivalent of 75 dBA for 40 hours/week for children and users who are sensitive to intense sound stimulation.

=== Personal sound amplification products (PSAPs) ===
Personal sound amplification products are ear-level amplification devices intended for use by persons with normal hearing. The output levels of 27 PSAPs that were commercially available in Europe were analyzed in 2014. All of them had a maximum output level that exceeded 120 dB SPL; 23 (85%) exceeded 125 dB SPL, while 8 (30%) exceeded 130 dB SPL. None of the analyzed products had a level limiting option.

The report triggered the development of a few standards for these devices. The ANSI/CTA standard 2051 on "Personal Sound Amplification Performance Criteria" followed in 2017. It specified a maximum output sound pressure level of 120 dB SPL. In 2019, the ITU published standard ITU-T H.871 called "Safe listening guidelines for personal sound amplifiers". This standard recommends that PSAPs measure the weekly sound dose and adhere to a weekly maximum of less than 80 dBA for 40 hours. PSAPs that cannot measure weekly sound dose should limit the maximum output of the device to 95 dBA. It also recommends that PSAPs provide clear alerts in their user guides, packaging, and ads mentioning the risks of ear damage that can result from using the device and providing information on how to avoid these risks. A technical paper describing how to test the compliance of various personal audio systems/devices to the essential/mandatory and optional features of Recommendation ITU-T H.870 was published in 2021.

=== Entertainment venues ===
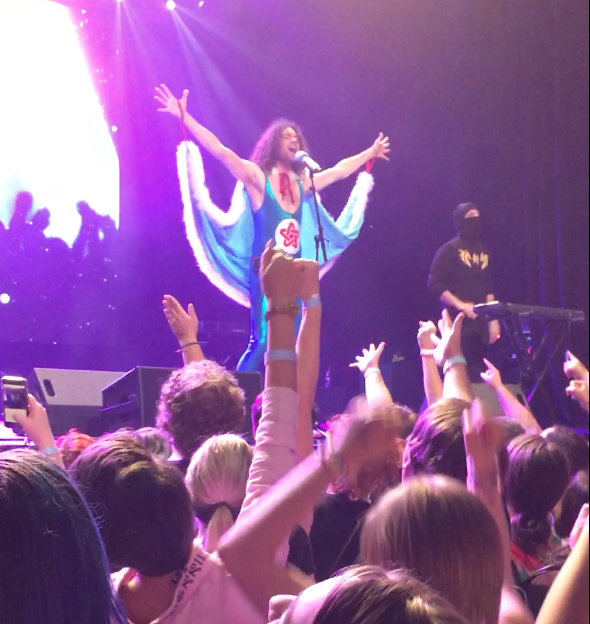
Live rock concert at indoor entertainment venue

Both those working in the music industry and those enjoying recreational music at venues and events can be at risk of experiencing hearing disorders. In 2019, the WHO published a report summarizing regulations for control of sound exposure in entertainment venues in Belgium, France, and Switzerland. The case studies were published as an initial step towards the development of a WHO regulatory framework for control of sound exposure in entertainment venues. In 2020, a couple of reports described exposure scenarios and procedures in use during entertainment events. These took into account the safety of those attending an event, those exposed occupationally to the high intensity music, as well as those in surrounding neighborhoods. Technical solutions, practices of monitoring and on-stage sound are presented, as well as the problems of enforcing environmental noise regulations in an urban environment, with country specific examples.

Several different regulatory approaches have been implemented to manage sound levels and minimize the risk of hearing damage for those attending music venues. A report published in 2020 identified 18 regulations regarding sound levels in entertainment venues – 12 from Europe and the remainder from cities or states in North and South America. Legislative approaches include: sound level limitations, real-time sound exposure monitoring, mandatory supply of hearing protection devices, signage and warning requirements, loudspeaker placement restrictions, and ensuring patrons can access quiet zones or rest areas. The effectiveness of these measures in reducing the risk of hearing damage has not been evaluated, but the adaptation of the approaches described above is consistent with the general principles of the hierarchy of controls used to manage exposure to noise in workplaces.

Patrons of music venues have indicated their preference for lower sound levels and can be receptive when earplugs are provided or made accessible. This finding may be region or country-specific. In 2018, the U.S. Centers for Disease Control and Prevention published the results of a survey of U.S. adults related to the use of a hearing protection device during exposure to loud sounds at recreational events. Overall, more than four of five reported never or seldom wearing hearing protection devices when attending a loud athletic or entertainment event. Adults aged 35 years and older were significantly more likely to not wear hearing protection than were young adults aged 18–24 years. Among adults who frequently enjoy attending sporting events, women were twice as likely as men to seldom or never wear hearing protection. Adults who were more likely to wear protection had at least some college education or had higher household incomes. Adults with hearing impairment or with a deaf or hard-of-hearing household member were significantly more likely to wear their protective devices.

The challenges in implementing measures to reduce risks to hearing in a wide range of entertainment venues – whether through mandatory or voluntary guidelines, with or without enforcement – are significant. It requires involvement from many different professional groups and buy-in from both venue managers and users. The WHO and ITU Global Standard for Venues and Events released on World Hearing Day 2022 offers resources to facilitate action. The standard details six features recommended for safe listening venues and events. The standard can be used by Governments to implement legislation, by owners and managers of venues and events to protect their clientele, and by audio engineers, and by other staff.

A 2023 survey showed that U.S. adults acknowledge the risks posed by high sound exposures at concerts and other events. Results indicated an interest towards protective actions, such as limiting sound levels, posting warning signs, and wearing hearing protection. Fifty four percent of the study participants agreed that sound levels at concert venues should be limited to reduce risk for hearing disorders, seventy five percent agreed that warning signs should be posted when sound levels are likely to exceed safe levels, and 61% of respondents stated that they would wear hearing protection if s provided when sound levels were likely to exceed safe levels.

== Personal interventions ==
While establishing effective public and community health interventions, enacting appropriate legislation and regulations, and developing pertinent standards for listening and audio systems are all important in establishing a societal infrastructure for safe listening, Individuals can take steps to ensure that their personal listening habits minimize their risk of hearing problems. Personal safe listening strategies include:

- Listening to PLSs at safe levels, such as 60% of the volume range. Noise-cancelling headphones and sound-isolating earphones can help one avoid turning the volume up to overcome loud background noise.
- Sound measurement apps can help one find out how loud sounds are. If not measuring the sound levels, a good rule of thumb is that sounds are potentially hazardous if it is necessary to speak in a raised voice to be heard by someone an arm's length away. Moving away from the sound or using hearing protection are approaches to reduce exposure levels.
- Monitoring the amount of time spent in loud activities helps one manage risk. Whenever possible, take a break between exposures so the ears can rest and recover.
- Watching for warning signs of hearing loss. Tinnitus, difficulty hearing high pitched sounds (such as birds singing or cell phone notifications), and trouble understanding speech in background noise can be indicators of hearing loss.
- Getting a hearing test regularly. The American Speech Language Hearing Association recommends that school-aged children be screened for hearing loss annually from kindergarten through the third grade, then again in 7th and 11th grade. Adults should have their hearing tested every ten years until they reach age 50, and every three years after that. Hearing should be tested sooner if any warning signs develop.

Teaching children and young adults about the hazards of overexposure to loud sounds and how to practice safe listening habits could help protect their hearing. Good role models in their own listening habits could also prompt healthy listening habits. Health care professionals have the opportunity to educate patients about relevant hearing risks and promote safe listening habits. As part of their health promotion activities, hearing professionals can recommend appropriate hearing protection when necessary and provide information, training and fit-testing to ensure individuals are adequately but not overly protected. Wearing earplugs to concerts has been shown to be an effective way to reduce post-concert temporary hearing changes.

== See also ==
- Sound
- Sound power level
- Noise-induced hearing loss
- Noise regulation
- Loud music
- Global Audiology
- Health problems of musicians
- Hearing
- Electronic Music Foundation
- Tinnitus
- Diplacusis
- Hyperacusis
- World Hearing Day
- Safe-in-Sound Award
- International Society of Audiology
- Acoustic trauma
- List of films featuring the deaf and hard of hearing
