= Buy Quiet =

American health and safety initiative

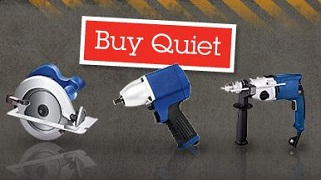
Examples of quieter machinery and tools

Buy Quiet is an American health and safety initiative to select and purchase the lowest noise emitting power tools and machinery in order to reduce occupational and community noise exposure. Buy Quiet Programs are examples of noise control strategies. Buy Quiet is part of the larger Hearing Loss Prevention Program, and is an example of Prevention Through Design, which seeks to reduce occupational injury through prevention considerations in designs that impact workers.

Organizations that have embarked upon the buy-quiet initiative are moving towards the creation of an environment and workplace where there will be no harmful noise. Many companies are automating equipment or setting up procedures that can be operated by workers from a quiet control room free from harmful noise, chemical agents, and heat. Some of such companies that been recognized for their demonstrated results from noise control and Buy Quiet initiatives, with a Safe-in-Sound Excellence in Hearing Loss Prevention Award The objectives of this award are to recognize effective and innovative initiatives, and to share that information to a broader community.

== Health effects from noise ==
Noise-induced hearing loss is an irreversible condition that is 100% preventable, and over 30 million US workers are exposed to hazardous noise on the job, which makes them susceptible to noise-induced hearing loss and tinnitus. Noise-induced hearing loss is also the most common occupational illness in the United States. The National Institute for Occupational Safety and Health recommends that workers be exposed to no more than 85 dB per eight hours per day.

== The EPA Buy Quiet Program (1970s–80s) ==
A formal Buy Quiet program of the late 1970s and early 1980s was a cooperative effort of the United States Environmental Protection Agency (EPA), the National Institute of Governmental Purchasing (NIGP), and the National League of Cities (NLC). This program represented a marked departure from the regulatory approach that the U.S. Government still uses to compel the manufacture and sales of products that are less harmful to human health.

Instead of regulations, the EPA/NIGP/NLC initiative used the power of high volume procurements by governments at all levels to stimulate a market demand for quiet products. This market-based, incentive-driven approach enabled federal, state, and local governments to purchase quieter products and equipment at competitive prices, by awarding procurements to the lowest "effective bid price”. The effective bid price adjusted the monetary bid price by the sound level of the bidder's equipment in comparison to the average level of all bidders' proposals.

Products purchased under this program included construction equipment, lawn and garden equipment, trash trucks/compactors, chain saws, and similar noise generating equipment. The program was part of an initiative to help localities create "quiet communities". States and localities that participated were encouraged also to promote similar Buy Quiet procurements by private sector organizations in their jurisdictions as a way of "spreading" the market.

The EPA/NIGP/NLC Buy Quiet program extended the concepts of "social marketing" to include the creation of markets for socially and environmentally responsible products. It did this by combining incentivized procurements with the development of a national database of buy quiet purchases available to all interested parties. This database demonstrated that incentivized procurements could achieve quiet products at competitive prices.

The lowest "bid price" was most often the lowest "effective bid price" and quiet products were indicative of high quality and high performing products. The incentive mechanism was also used to purchase low maintenance and low energy products, and is adaptable to other sustainable product initiatives. The Buy Quiet program ended with the dissolution of the Office of Noise Abatement and Control in EPA during the Reagan Administration.

== Contemporary Buy Quiet programs ==
=== NYC ===
In July 2007, New York City’s Department of Environmental Protection promulgated rules concerning citywide construction noise mitigation. These new rules reward contractors deploying tools and machinery that use the best available noise control technologies, are designed for quiet, or are known to be the quietest available models of their type. The New York City Department of Environmental Protection released a products and vendor guidance sheet in order to assist contractors for achieving compliance with the New York City Noise Regulations.

=== NASA ===
In 2006, the National Aeronautics and Space Administration (NASA) codified a Buy Quiet program. In 2009 NASA implemented an online tool called the NASA Buy-Quiet Roadmap.

=== National Institute for Occupational Safety and Health ===
A video describing the Buy Quiet program in the context of construction

A video describing the Buy Quiet program in the context of manufacturing

National Institute for Occupational Safety and Health (NIOSH) researchers developed a Buy Quiet prevention initiative intended to facilitate the implementation of Buy Quiet programs for the construction and manufacturing sectors. As a part of this, NIOSH created a searchable database describing noise emission levels of powered hand tools. The database is called the NIOSH Power Tools Database. In 2014, NIOSH officially launched a Buy Quiet website and blog to promote the purchase of quieter tools and equipment. The initiative also aims to encourage manufacturers to design quieter equipment.

The intention of Buy Quiet programs is to reduce the risk of hearing loss at the worksite. Buy Quiet programs seek to minimize the impact of noise on communities and help companies comply with OSHA and other noise regulation requirements as well. Additionally, Buy Quiet concepts may reduce the long-term costs of audiometric testing, personal protective equipment, and workers’ compensation. NIOSH suggests Buy Quiet programs contain the following elements:

1. An inventory of existing machinery and tools with corresponding noise levels. The company’s purchaser can use the inventory to compare noise levels of equipment before buying or renting. The inventory can also be used for assisting, tracking, and promoting a company’s Buy Quiet purchases.
2. A Buy Quiet company policy or procedure. Policy can be an easy and effective way for employers to show commitment to protecting the hearing and well-being of their employees by using the best equipment available.
3. Educational materials and promotional tools. These resources should be designed to help inform employees, management, customers, and the community about the importance and benefits of Buy Quiet. NIOSH has developed a series of posters for public use.
4. Cost-Benefit Analysis of Buy Quiet programs. The quieter piece of equipment may be the least expensive when all life cycle costs of the machinery, possible workers’ compensation claims, costs associated with a company’s hearing conservation program, costs of healthcare (such as hearing aids), and lost productivity are counted. NIOSH estimates a savings of $100 per decibel reduced when purchasing a quieter machine.

=== Laborers' Health and Safety Fund ===
The Laborers' Health and Safety Fund of North America indicates buying quieter equipment as a cost-effective way to reduce noise at a construction worksite in its Best Practices Guide on Controlling Noise on Construction Sites.

== See also ==
- Health effects from noise
- Environmental noise
- Noise pollution
- Noise control
- Noise regulation
- Occupational noise
- Safe-in-Sound Excellence in Hearing Loss Prevention Award
