= World Hearing Day =

Annual WHO campaign about hearing loss

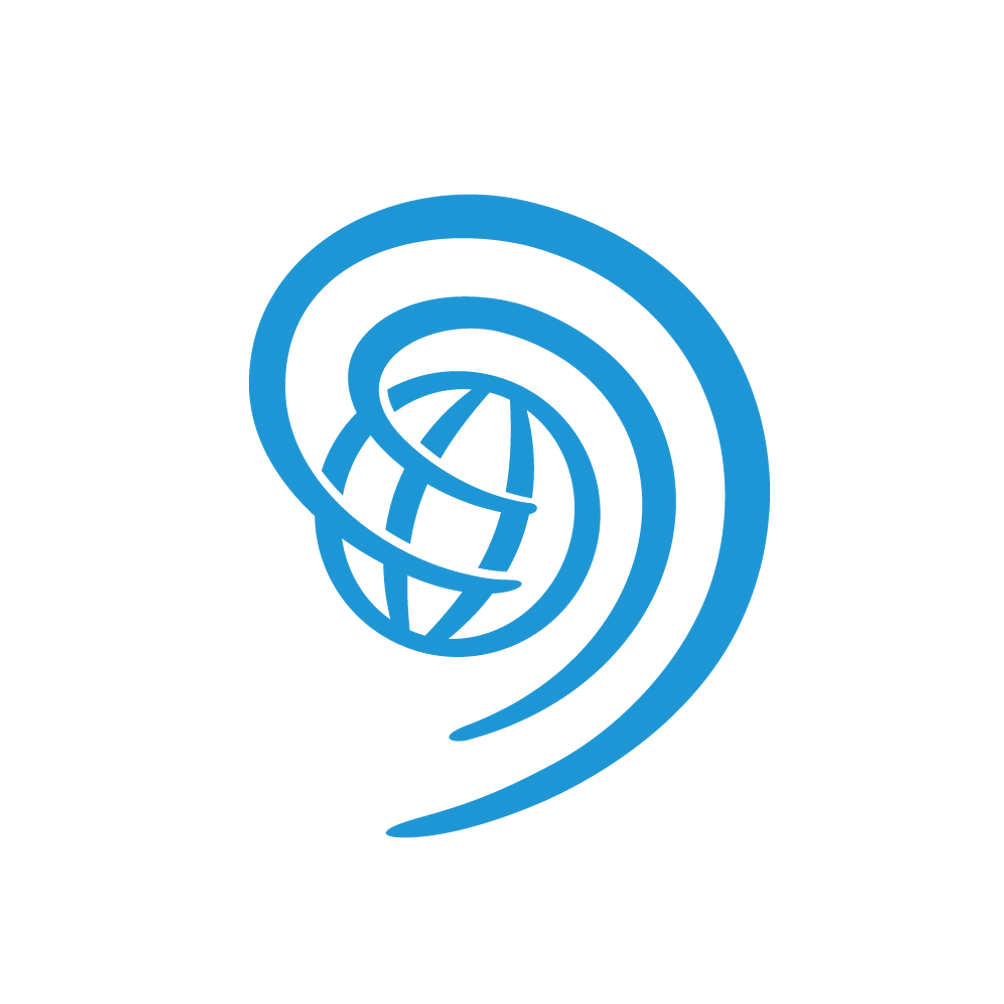
Logo of the World Hearing Day

World Hearing Day is a campaign held each year by Office of Prevention of Blindness and Deafness of the World Health Organization (WHO). Activities take place across the globe and an event is hosted at the World Health Organization in Geneva annually on March 3. The campaign's objectives are to share information and promote actions towards the prevention of hearing loss and improved hearing care. Any individual or organization can participate in various ways, by sharing campaign materials and organizing outreach actions. Examples are provided in the World Hearing Day annual activities reports. For participation to be recognized, one needs to register and report on their activity.

The first event was held in 2015. Before then it was known as International Ear Care Day. Each year, the WHO selects a theme, develops educational materials, and makes these freely available in several languages. It also coordinates and reports on events around the globe, as well as a small grants program to facilitate participation.

== 2027 ==
"Hearing loss doesn't wait. Neither should you" In 2027, the World Health Organization is calling attention towars adults who live or are living at risk of hearing loss. Hearing loss, particularly when unaddressed, can negatively affect many aspects of adult life. It can raise the likelyhood of unemployment or underemployment, contributes to social isolation, and towards declining cognitive health/dementia. Hearing loss can be prevented and addressed. World Hearing Day 2027 will focus on why this matter to individuals and societies and how to prevent such negative effects. An edit-a-thon offers one of the many opportunity for individuals and institutions to participate in the campaign.

== 2026 ==
World Hearing Day 2026 highlighted the theme "From communities to classrooms: hearing care for all children." It aims to prompt activities designed to prevent avoidable childhood hearing loss and ensure early identification of and care for children with ear or hearing problems. The integration of hearing care into school health and child health programs can help detect and treat ear and hearing disorders. Globally acute and chronic otitis media impacted ear wax are still common, preventable and treatable causes of hearing loss. But they can remain undiagnosed and untreated, and the hearing loss from these conditions can worsen over time. It can negatively impact speech comprehension, language, cognitive and social development. These effects can lead to poorer educational outcomes and, later in life, affect employment prospects. In 2026 the edit-a-thon Wiki4WorldHearingDay attracted 13 ediots who edited 472 Wikipedia articles, which recved 12 million views during the track period (see dedicated dashboard).

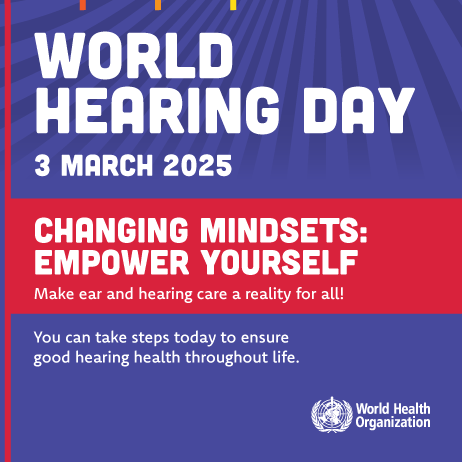
World Hearing Day 2025

== 2025 ==
For 2025, the theme of the campaign was "Empower yourself" encouraging individuals to take steps to ensure good hearing in all stages of life. This focus is a new angle of the theme of the 2024 World Hearing Day "Changing mindsets". Wiki4WorldHearingDay2025 an edit-a-thon, was part of the 2024 activities of the campaign, to facilitate the contribution of hearing-related content into Wikipedia in several languages. A Wikimedia dashboard indicates the extent of the participation and reach of the expanded content.

== 2024 ==
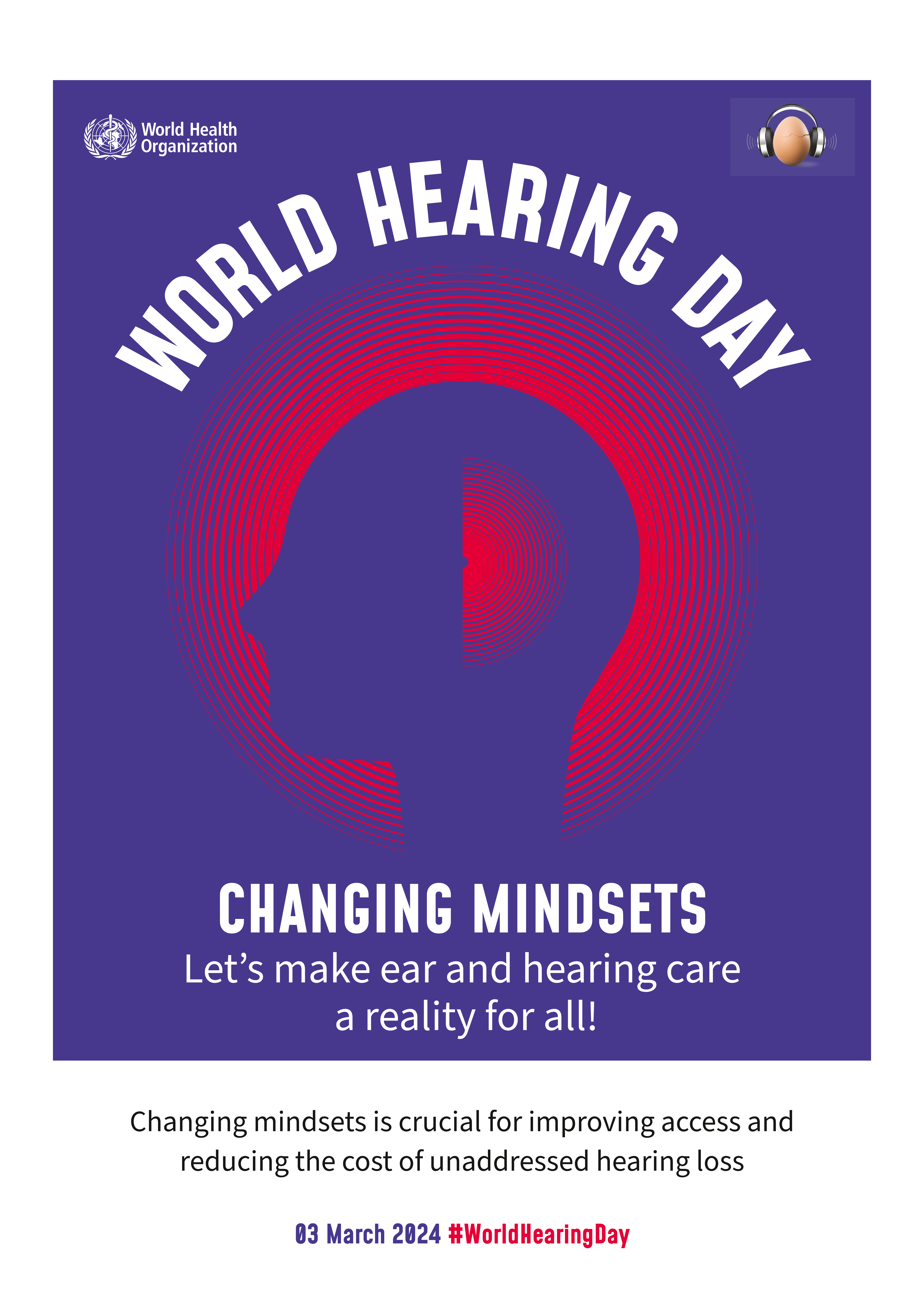
2024 World Hearing Day, "Changing mindsets"

The 2024 World Hearing Day campaign focused on overcoming challenges posed by societal misperceptions and stigmatizing mindsets through awareness-raising and information-sharing targeted at the public and healthcare providers. The chosen theme for 2024 was "Changing mindsets: let's make ear and hearing care a reality for all!"

WHO has emphasized that over 80% of people globally who require hearing care are not receiving it. This situation incurs an estimated cost of US$1 trillion related to unaddressed hearing loss.

Wiki4WorldHearingDay2024 an edit-a-thon, was part of the 2024 activities of the campaign, to facilitate the contribution of hearing-related content into Wikipedia in several languages. Activities were reported in a Wikimedia dashboard.

== 2023 ==
The theme for 2023 and subsequent years is "Ear and hearing care for all! Let's make it a reality".

A new training manual "Primary ear and hearing care training manual for health workers and general practitioners" was released on March 3, 2023, and it is accompanied by a trainer's handbook and other community resources. A video by WHO's director-general Tedros Adhanom Ghebreyesus explains the effort.

Wiki4WorldHearingDay2023 an edit-a-thon, was part of the 2023 activities of the campaign, to facilitate the contribution of hearing-related content into Wikipedia in several languages. Activities were reported in a Wikimedia dashboard and in an article describing the different strategies used during the activity.

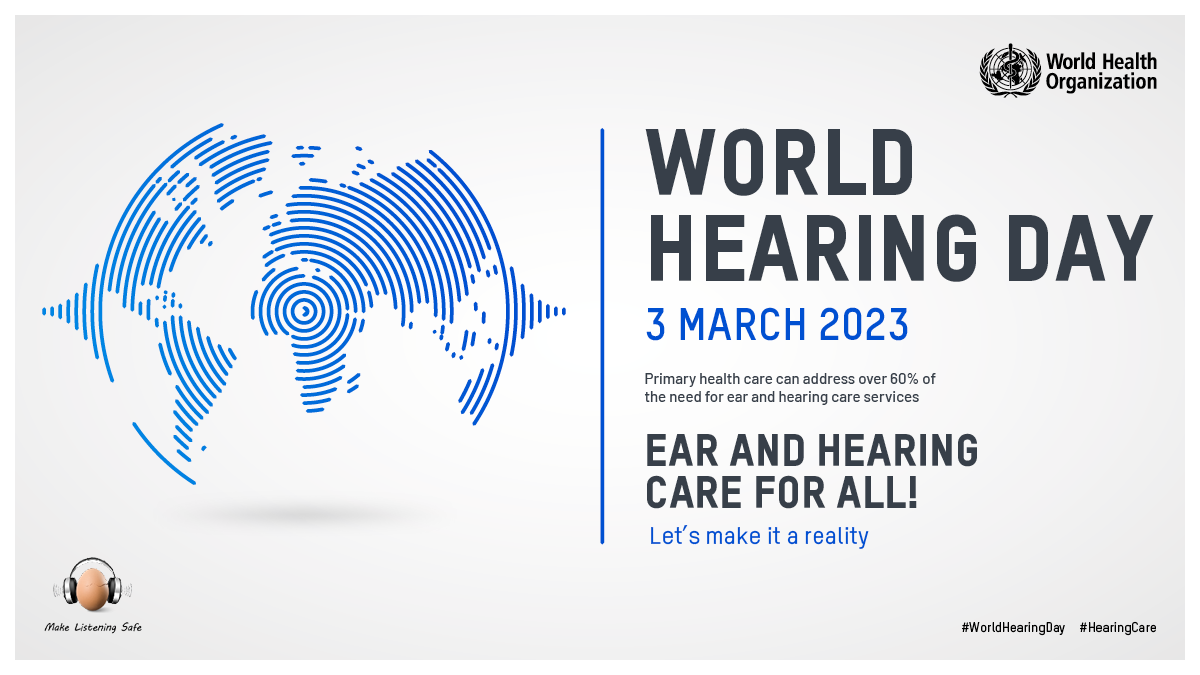
2023 World Hearing Day, "Ear and hearing care for all!"

== 2022 ==
The theme of World Hearing Day 2022 was "To hear for life, listen with care."

Key messages and information focused on the importance and means of preventing hearing loss from recreational sounds through safe listening. During World Hearing Day 2022 these resources were launched:

- a Global standard for safe listening entertainment venues and events, detailing safe listening features. The features can be implemented by governments, venue and event owners, and event staff such as audio engineers.
- an mSafeListening handbook, on how to create an mHealth safe listening program.
- and a media toolkit for journalists containing key information and how to talk about safe listening.

== 2021 ==
The theme of the campaign for 2021 was "Hearing Care for All." The launch of the World Report on Hearing (WRH) took place on March 3, 2021, during an event at the World Health Organization in Geneva. It was a global call for action to address hearing loss and ear diseases across the life course, and to expand health services to populations. Activities were summarized in the 2021 report.

== 2020 ==
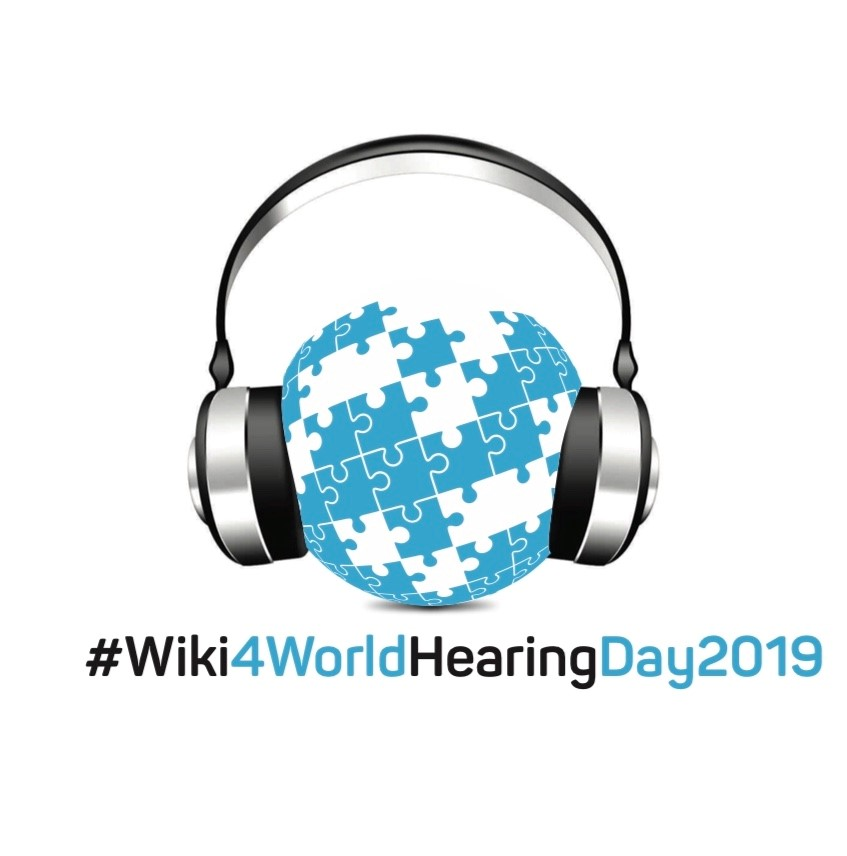
Logo for Wiki4WorldHearingDay2019

The theme of the campaign for 2020 was "Hearing for Life. Don't let hearing loss limit you". Materials developed of the 2020 campaign highlighted that timely and effective interventions can ensure that people with hearing loss are able to achieve their full potential.

== Previous years ==
2019: The theme of the campaign for 2019 was "Check your hearing" as data from both developed and developing countries indicate that a significant part of the burden associated with hearing loss comes from unaddressed hearing difficulties.

A study conducted in the United Kingdom indicate that only 20% of those who have a hearing problem seek treatment. A study performed in South Africa reported that individuals who experience hearing difficulties wait between 5 and 16 years to seek diagnosis and treatment. Two hundred and ninety one events/activities from 81 countries were registered, and will be described in their annual report. For the celebration, on February 25, 2019, WHO launched hearWHO, a free application for mobile devices which allows people to check their hearing regularly and intervene early in case of hearing loss. The app is targeted at those who are at risk of hearing loss or who already experience some of the symptoms related to hearing loss.

Wiki4WorldHearingDay2019, an edit-a-thon, was part of the 2019 activities of the campaign, to facilitate the contribution of hearing-related content into Wikipedia in several languages. Activities were reported in a Wikimedia dashboard and summarized a few publications. In addition, a Meet-up took place with presentations by researchers from HEAR in Cincinnati, from the National Institute for Occupational Safety and Health, the National Center on Birth Defects and Developmental Disabilities and National Center for Environmental Health, of the Centers for Disease Control and Prevention, by the Wikipedian-in-Residence from the National Institute for Occupational Safety and Health, and the Wikipedia Consultant for Cochrane.

2018: The theme of World Hearing Day 2018 was "Hear the future".

2017: The theme of World Hearing Day 2017 was "Action for hearing loss: make a sound investment", which focused on the economic impact of hearing loss.

2016: The theme of World Hearing Day 2016 was "Childhood hearing loss: act now, here is how!".

2015: The theme for World Hearing Day was "Make Listening Safe".

== See also ==
- Hearing
- Hearing loss
- Tinnitus
- Health problems of musicians
- Safe listening
- Safe-in-Sound Award
