= Acoustic trauma =

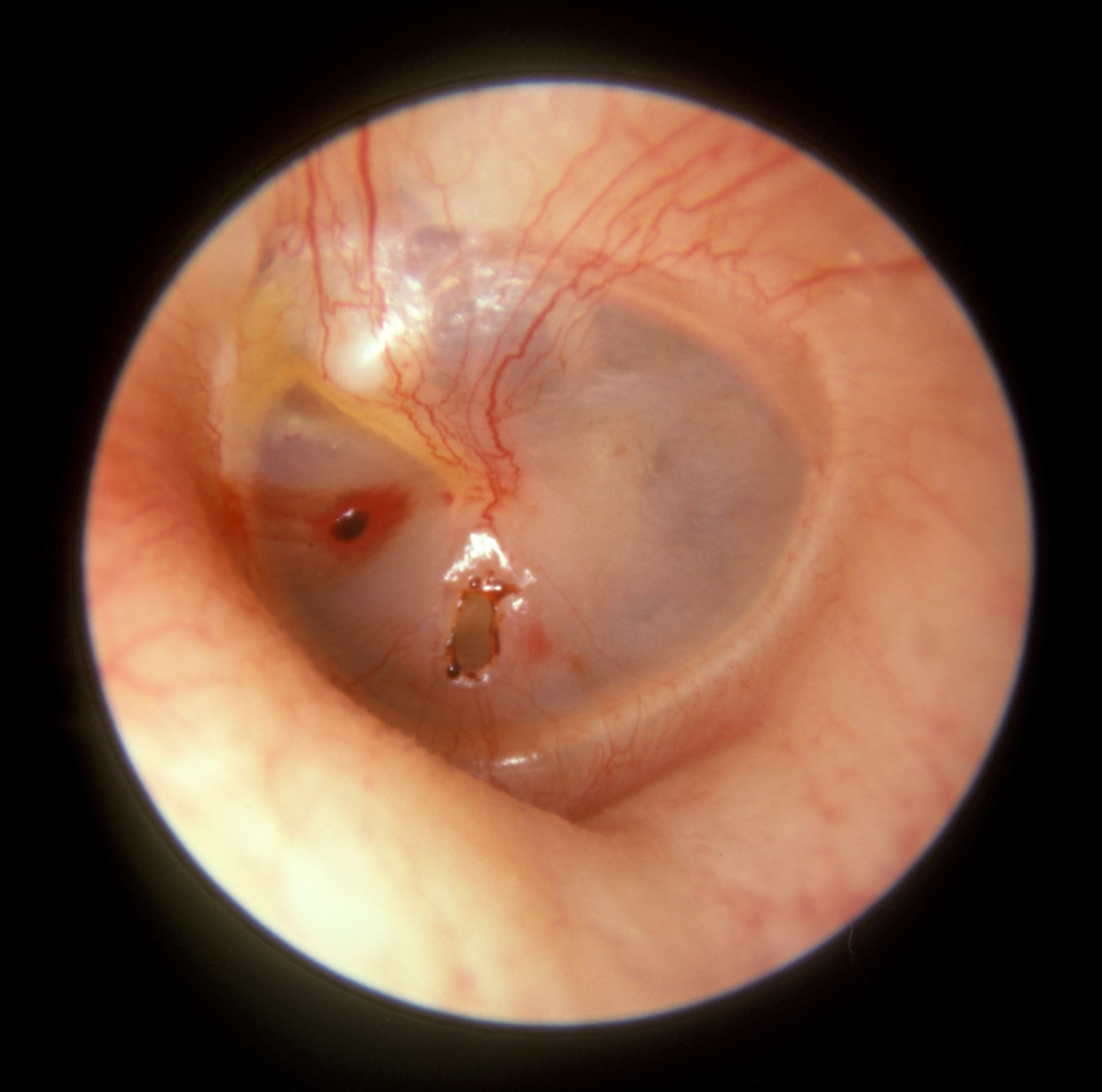
- The oval perforation in this left tympanic membrane was the result of a slap on the ear four days previously. The sudden increased air pressure in the external auditory canal produced this traumatic blast perforation.
- Specialty: Audiology

Acoustic trauma is the sustainment of an injury to the eardrum as a result of a very loud noise. Its scope usually covers loud noises with a short duration, such as an explosion, gunshot or a burst of loud shouting. Quieter sounds that are concentrated in a narrow frequency may also cause damage to specific frequency receptors. The range of severity can vary from pain to hearing loss.

Acute acoustic trauma can be treated by combining hyperbaric oxygen therapy (HBO) with corticosteroids. Acute noise exposure causes inflammation and lower oxygen supply in the inner ear. Corticosteroids hinder the inflammatory reaction and HBO provides an adequate oxygen supply. This therapy has been shown to be effective when initiated within three days after acoustic trauma. Therefore, this condition is considered an ENT emergency.

== Signs and symptoms ==
Hazardous noise causes injury to the hearing mechanisms in the inner ear. Acoustic trauma may result in Sensorineural hearing loss (SNHL) that is either temporary (temporary threshold shift, TTS) or permanent (permanent threshold shift, PTS). A TTS will resolve with time, while the time frame for hearing recovery is unique in every case, any SNHL that persists beyond eight weeks after injury is most likely permanent and should be considered PTS.

- Hearing loss
- Tinnitus (ringing in the ear)
- Aural fullness (ear fullness)
- Recruitment (ear pain with loud noise)
- Difficulty localizing sounds
- Difficult in hearing a noisy background
- Vertigo
- Hypertension (high blood pressure)
- Cardiovascular disease

== Causes ==
Acoustic trauma is an injury to the inner ear that's often caused by exposure to a high-decibel noise. This injury can occur after exposure to a single, loud noise or from exposure to noises at significant decibels over a longer period of time. Many cases have included a period of reduced hearing after exposure to loud sounds. Examples include after mowing a lawn, using power tools, or operating heavy machinery. This kind of hearing impairment is often temporary. After some recovery time, the acoustic trauma often will stop.

=== Threshold of Hearing (Decibel, dB) ===
- 0-30: Faint
- 40-60: Moderate to quiet
- 70-90: Very noisy
- 100-120: Pain
- 130-180: Intolerable

== Pathophysiology ==
Acoustic trauma occurs when a continuous transient sounds transfers enough energy to a cochlea to result in necrosis of the outer hair cells (OHC), inner hair cells (IHC), and cause glutamate excitotoxicity of first-order afferent neurons of the spiral ganglion (cochlear synaptopathy). This can occur when an impact or impulse sound like an explosion occurs abruptly. When excessive, this force can lead to cellular metabolic overload, cell damage and cell death. The force of that transient sound exceeds the elastic limit of the tissues. The organ of Corti can be sheared off the basilar membrane when the sound coming through the ear canal, middle ear and cochlea exceeds 132 dB. If the sound is more intense than 184 dB, the eardrum is ruptured. 184 dB and above usually comes from military sound exposures, such as with the explosion of an IED (improvised explosive device). When a person has a shock wave, not only is the eardrum ruptured, but also has ossicular discontinuities. The explosion or blast if powerful can cause traumatic brain injury. As a result, a person could have an auditory processing disability. Lung injuries can develop as well as some injuries to the viscera. Once exposure to damaging noise levels is discontinued, further significant progression of hearing loss stops. Individual susceptibility to noise-induced hearing loss varies greatly, but the reason that some people are more resistant to it while others are susceptible is not well understood.

== Diagnosis ==
The diagnosis is based on what environmental factors of that loud noise that was exposed. Audiometry will be used to detect signs of acoustic trauma. In this test, there are different sounds of varying loudness and of different tones that are exposed to more carefully assess what can be heard and what can't be heard.

== Treatment/Prevention ==
There are various treatment methods available depending on how severe the acoustic trauma is. Acoustic trauma cannot be reversed as of today. The goal of treatment is to protect the ear from further damage. Below are possible preventive measures and treatment methods that could help in cases of acoustic trauma

- Hyperbaric Oxygen therapy: Only when the case is extremely serious.
- Corticosteroids drugs: anti-inflammatory drug.
- Eardrum repair
- Using technological assistance for hearing loss such as a hearing aids
- Ear protection
  - Using earplugs, earmuffs and other kinds of devices to protect the hearing.
  - Segregating from events and environments where the noise is fairly louder than usual.
- Hearing loss prevention program (HLPP).

There are five categories of preventative measures for acoustic trauma, elimination, substitution, engineering controls, administrative controls, and personal protective equipment (PPE). If the noise hazard can not be removed, substituted for a lesser hazard, or controlled to where it is no longer a hazard, then there needs to be a hearing loss prevention program in place. A hearing loss prevention program helps mitigate the amount of hearing damage done to workers. The duration exposed to different levels of noise is important to consider. Below are noise levels and their recommended exposure time:

Noise Level	Recommended Exposure Time
100 dBA	15 Minutes
97 dBA	30 Minutes
94 dBA	1 Hour
91 dBA	2 Hours
88 dBA	4 Hours
85 dBA	8 Hours
83 dBA	16 Hours

== Prognosis ==
Each episode of acoustic trauma results in permanent damage within the inner ear, even though the majority of patients, the symptoms will disappear and an audiogram will show normal hearing within a few hours to a few days. In some cases, the changes seen in the audiogram will only partially improve or remain permanent. One of the signs and symptoms of acoustic trauma is tinnitus and this may persist for a long time. In some cases, tinnitus may become a permanent condition. There is no specific study done on Life Expectancy or statistical information for the prognosis of acoustic trauma. Overall, depending on how powerful the noise was and how and what degree of the severity, the prognosis is quite difficult to predict.

== Epidemiology ==
The prevalence depends on the environmental factors. Acoustic trauma is quite common during military service and during hunting activities, where it is mainly associated with gun sports and particularly accidental shots. Of teenagers, 20-50 percent experience exposure to noise levels high enough to cause acute acoustic trauma. Hearing loss due to noise is the second most common sensorineural hearing loss, after age-related hearing loss (presbycusis). Of more than 28 million Americans with some degree of hearing impairment, as many as 10 million have hearing loss caused by in part by excessive noise exposure in the workplace or during recreational activities.

== See also ==
- Tinnitus
- Hearing loss
- Noise-induced hearing loss
- Safe listening
- Hearing protection devices
- Acoustic epidemiology
