= Hearing Health Foundation =

Nonprofit organization

- Founded: 1958
- Founder: Collette Ramsey Baker
- Type: Public Charity- 501(c)(3)
- Purpose: To prevent and cure hearing loss and tinnitus through research and to promote hearing health.
- Location: New York City, New York, United States
- Region served: United States
- Method: Private Donations
- Key people: Jay Grushkin (Chair); Paul E. Orlin (Vice Chair); Elizabeth Keithley, Ph.D. (Chair Emerita); Robert Boucai (Treasurer); Judy Dubno, Ph.D. (Secretary); Timothy Higdon (CEO)
- Employees: 6
- Website: hearinghealthfoundation.org
- Formerly called: Deafness Research Foundation (1958–2011)

Hearing Health Foundation (HHF) is a 501(c)(3) nonprofit organization. In 2011, the Deafness Research Foundation changed its name to Hearing Health Foundation.

HHF was founded as the Deafness Research Foundation in 1958, by Collette Ramsey Baker, a woman who lived with a substantial hearing loss. Since then, HHF has worked to provide funding for basic, clinical and translational research in hearing and balance science, and worked towards research and treatments for people with hearing loss, tinnitus, and other hearing conditions. This includes funding research that led to the development of cochlear implants and treatments for otosclerosis (abnormal bone growth in the ear) and ear infections. In the 1990s HHF advocated in Washington, D.C., for universal neonatal hearing screening legislation, to detect hearing loss at birth.

The primary aims of the foundation are to promote awareness of hearing health and the prevention of noise induced hearing loss, provide seed money to researchers focused on hearing and balance science through grants, and to find better therapies and cures for hearing loss and tinnitus through the Hearing Restoration Project (HRP) and Emerging Research Grants (ERG) programs.

== History ==
The Deafness Research Foundation (DRF) was founded by Collette Ramsey Baker on February 1, 1958. Born in Waverly, Tennessee, Ramsey Baker lived with substantial hearing loss for many years before she had her hearing completely restored at age 35, with an early fenestration operation. She then founded the DRF. A recurrent model for the renowned painter Howard Chandler Christy and an avid golfer, she received letters of commendation from US Presidents Herbert Hoover and Dwight Eisenhower, Helen Keller and Cardinal Francis Spellman.

In 1960, DRF and the American Academy of Otolaryngology created the National Temporal Bone Banks Program, to collect and study the human temporal bone, and to encourage temporal bone donation. In 1992 the NIDCD National Temporal Bone, Hearing and Balance Pathology Resource Registry was founded as a nonprofit organization by the National Institute of Deafness and other Communication Disorders (NIDCD) of the National Institutes of Health to continue and expand on the activities of the former National Temporal Bone Banks Program.

By 1972, the DRF was funding research on cochlear implants, with later grants in single channel to multi-channel implants, speech perception among cochlear implant users, and implants in children. Substantial research and significant contribution in the prevention and treatment of middle ear infection was made by researchers who were awarded grants. In 1977 the DRF funded research in outer ear hair cell motility that led to a new method for measuring the health of a newborn's ear, and began funding research to understand how sensory cells transmit sounds from the world to the brain.

The DRF funded research led, in 1987, to the discovery of spontaneous regeneration of hair cells in chickens, thus igniting the field of hair cell regeneration in humans. Research on the regrowth of cochlea cells may lead to medical treatments that restore hearing. Unlike birds and reptiles, humans and other mammals are normally unable to regrow the cells of the inner ear that convert sound into neural signals when those cells are damaged by age or disease.

In 1989 the DRF funded Meniere's Disease Study Center for improved evaluation and better treatments of Ménière's disease.

In celebration of its 50th anniversary, the DRF rang the opening bell at the New York Stock Exchange in 2008.

The organization decided to change its name from The Deafness Research Foundation to Hearing Health Foundation. On September 14, 2011, the Chair of the Board, Clifford P. Tallman, Jr., announced the name change of the DRF to Hearing Health Foundation and presented a new research consortium, the Hearing Restoration Project.

== Research programs ==
=== Emerging Research Grants ===
Through its Emerging Research Grants (ERG), HHF provides seed money to researchers, particularly those whose work is focused on areas of otology that have been under-researched and under-represented through traditional funding mechanisms. Through ERG, HHF has awarded over millions of dollars through more than 2,200 scientific research grants to researchers.

Many of HHF's grantees have also received federal grants. Former grantees make up 20 percent of recipients of the Association for Research in Otolaryngology Award of Merit. Many researchers we funded go on to obtain National Institutes of Health (NIH) funding for their work.

Hearing Health Foundation supports research in the following areas:

- Fundamental Auditory Research – development, genetics, molecular biology, physiology, anatomy, and regeneration biology
- Cochlear implants
- Surgical therapy for otosclerosis
- Hair cell regeneration
- Hearing aids technology
- Central Auditory Processing Disorder (CAPD)
- Stria vascularis
- Noise-induced hearing loss
- Presbycusis or age-related hearing loss
- Viral infections causing hearing loss
- Sudden deafness
- Ototoxicity or drug-induced hearing loss
- Temporal bone pathology
- Otitis media, or ear infections
- Usher syndrome
- Vestibular and Balance Disorders (dizziness and vertigo, Ménière's disease)
- Tinnitus (ringing in the ears)
- Hyperacusis (decreased tolerance of sound)

=== Hearing Restoration Project ===
The Hearing Restoration Project (HRP) is a consortium of 14 senior scientists working collaboratively on scientific research towards inner ear hair cell regeneration and accelerate the time frame for developing a cure for hearing loss. The HRP brings together researchers from Harvard University, Stanford University, the University of Washington and elsewhere with the goal of researching and developing a genuine cure for most forms of acquired hearing loss by regenerating the inner ear hair cells that enable hearing.

==== Strategic research plan ====
- Phase 1 – Discovery research: Scientists have identified various pathways for hair cell regeneration. Since there are many potential gene targets, they continually utilize bioinformatics methods to winnow down and determine which are most relevant. Researchers have shown in the mouse neighboring supporting cells remain after deafening.
- Phase 2 – Recent technological advances have enabled researchers to examine single hair cells rather than entire clusters. This aids in the study of gene expression immediately after a single hair cell is damaged. Researchers are examining early events that occur in the hair cells of zebrafish and chicks, but not in mice. The genes not undergoing the same expression in the mouse as in the other two animal models will be targets for manipulation.
- Phase 3 – Develop treatments: Experimental models from Phase 2 will be used to screen for possible treatments.

==== Cell regeneration summit and webinars ====
- In 2011, Hearing Health Foundation hosted a public-focused health conference bringing together leaders in the field of cell regeneration research in the ear to discuss current research and potential therapies to restore hearing as part of the HRP.
- On May 21, 2015, Hearing Health Foundation hosted at live-video research briefing to provide updates on research programs and progress. Dr. Peter Barr-Gillespie, then Scientific Director, Hearing Restoration Project presented on the Hearing Restoration Project.

== Prevention and education ==
Hearing Health Foundation publishes the Hearing Health magazine, Hearing Health E-News, and a weekly blog to supply information about current research and technologies related to hearing loss, tinnitus, and other hearing conditions, as well as provides general information about the Foundation's work, education, and prevention efforts.

In 2011 HHF demonstrated how sound travels and educated approximately 18,000 children at Nickelodeon's "Day of Play" at the Mall in Washington, D.C.

In 2021 HHF launched its Keep Listening prevention campaign to promote hearing health and safe listening practices to prevent noise-induced hearing loss.
