= List of current youth hearing conservation programs =

List of current youth hearing conservation programs in the UK.

- SAFEEars!
- Don't Lose The Music
- It's a Noisy Planet
- Healthy Youth!
- Dangerous Decibels
- Wise Ears!
- HEARsmart

== See also ==
- Youth worker safety
- Hearing loss
- Hearing protection
- Headphones
