= EAV =

EAV may refer to:

- East Atlanta Village, in Atlanta, Georgia
- Electroacupuncture, an alternative medicine diagnostic device
- Equine arteritis virus, the causal agent of equine viral arteritis
- Entity–attribute–value model, a data model
- Erste Allgemeine Verunsicherung, an Austrian band
- Expired air ventilation
- Exposure action value
- Ente Autonomo Volturno, an Italian public transport company
