= Don't Lose The Music =

National charity campaign for the deaf people in the UK

Don't Lose the Music is a national campaign launched by the RNID, the charity representing the 9 million deaf and hard of hearing people in the UK.

== Objectives ==
The campaign aims to highlight the danger of listening to music too loudly – mainly focusing on exposure to loud music:

- at nightclubs
- at concerts/gigs
- on personal audio equipment

Experts agree that exposure to sounds over 85 dB over time can cause damage to hearing. Many concert venues and nightclubs play music at levels over 100 decibels. It is also possible to listen to music on personal audio equipment (such as MP3 players) at levels which exceed damage-risk criteria, depending on the equipment.

Damage to hearing is caused by a combination of three factors – length of exposure to the noise, the average level of the noise and the peak level of the noise. Another variable is individual susceptibility to hearing damage, which varies from person to person. Individual susceptibility is only known after hearing damage has been done.

A rule of thumb is that the louder the sound, the less time you should listen to it for.

Exposure to loud music can lead to a range of hearing problems such as noise-induced hearing loss, tinnitus and hyperacusis.

Here are some commonly quoted comparisons of sound levels:

- 0 dB(A) - the lowest sound level a person with normal hearing can detect
- 20 dB(A) - a quiet room at night
- 60 dB(A) - ordinary spoken conversation
- 80 dB(A) - shouting
- 90 dB(A) - an underground railway
- 110 dB(A) - a pneumatic drill nearby
- 130 dB(A) - an aeroplane taking off 100m (330 feet) away

== Events ==
In order to promote the campaign, RNID members attend music festivals and gigs, handing out earplugs and information.

== See also ==
- Hearing protectors
- RNID
- Noise-induced hearing loss
