= Young worker safety and health =

Around the world, nearly 250 million children, about one in every six children, ages 5 through 17, are involved in child labor. Children can be found in almost any economic sector. However, at a global level, most of them work in agriculture (70%). Approximately 2.4 million adolescents aged 16 to 17 years worked in the U.S. in 2006. Official employment statistics are not available for younger adolescents who are also known to work, especially in agricultural settings.

In 2006, 30 youth under 18 died from work-related injuries in the U.S. In 2003, an estimated 54,800 work-related injuries and illnesses among youth less than 18 years of age were treated in hospital emergency departments. The National Institute for Occupational Safety and Health reports that only one-third of work-related injuries are seen in emergency departments, therefore it is likely that approximately 160,000 youth sustain work-related injuries and illnesses each year. The highest number of teen worker fatalities occur in agricultural work and the retail trades, according to recent data. Across Europe, 18- to 24-year-olds are at least 50% more likely to be injured in the workplace than more experienced workers.

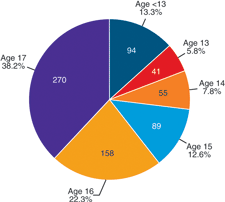
Number and distribution of fatal occupational injuries by age among young workers, 1992–2002 BLS 2003

== Work that poses special risks for young workers ==
A young worker describing a severe occupational injury

Because of their biologic, social, and economic characteristics, young workers have unique and substantial risks for work-related injuries and illnesses. Besides retail and agriculture, other areas of high risk for work-related injuries include construction and work activities involving motor vehicles and mobile machinery. Although safety requirements and child labor laws prohibit or restrict teen employment in certain kinds of industries and occupations, young workers may yet face risks on the job because an employer or a young employee may not be aware of applicable laws and may not be aware that a hazard exists, because the young employee may lack experience, or because there is inadequate training or supervision.

Child labor is the employment of children under an age determined by law or custom. This practice is considered exploitative by many countries and international organizations. Child labor was utilized to varying extents through most of history, but entered public dispute with the beginning of universal schooling, with changes in working conditions during industrialization, and with the emergence of the concepts of workers' and children's rights. Child labor is still common in some places. Even after passing child labor legislation, developing countries in particular still feature informal economies made up of child workers who are more exposed to human rights violations in the workplace.

=== Work in agriculture ===
There are roughly 250,000 children who work on U.S. farms, that do not live on the farm, and another 30 million children who visit farms annually. About every three days a child dies on a U.S. farm. In 2004, most youth work fatalities occurred in the agriculture sector. About two thirds of these fatalities could be attributed to transportation accidents. According to the "Occupational injuries among young workers" report, most of these transportation accidents occurred either by truck or by tractor. Tractor accidents alone counted for 1/4 of the youth worker fatalities from 1993 to 2002. For workers 13 years old and younger, agricultural fatalities accounted for 42 out of the 49 total fatalities for that age group between 1998 and 2002. There are fewer child labor restrictions on family-owned or operated farms; workers as young as 13 can legally operate tractors on farms if their family owns it or operates it.

Experiences and exposures across different sectors of agriculture vary greatly. For example, children who worked on tobacco farms experienced a number of negative health effects including nausea, heat exhaustion, and burning eyes.

=== Work in construction ===
Between the years 1998 and 2002, construction accidents accounted for 18% of youth worker fatalities, making construction the second most deadly industry for a young worker to be employed in during that time period. A significant number of young worker fatalities in this sector resulted from work that the young worker was not legally authorized to do. For example, 16-year-old workers accounted for almost 20% of the young worker fatalities in the construction sector between 1998 and 2002, even though workers 16 and younger are legally unauthorized to enter a construction site; if they do work for the construction industry, they can only work in an office or sales department. Additionally, Hispanic and Latino young workers made up 35% of the young worker fatalities in the construction sector. Hispanics make up 14.4% of the United States' general population.

=== Work in retail trades ===
The second highest number of workplace fatalities between 1993 and 1997 among workers younger than age 18 occurred in the retail trades (e.g., restaurants and retail stores). Between 1992 and 2000, 63% of these deaths were due to assaults and violent acts, most of which were homicides. Homicide associated with robbery is the probable cause for one fourth to one half of all young worker fatalities in retail trades. Handling cash, working alone or in small numbers, and working in the late evening and early morning hours may contribute to workplace homicides [NIOSH 1996a].

In 1998, more than half of all work-related nonfatal injuries to young workers occurred in retail trades, more than 60% of which were eating and drinking establishments. Cuts in retail trades were the most common type of injury treated in emergency departments, followed by burns in eating and drinking establishments and bruises, scrapes, and scratches in other retail settings. Common hazards in restaurants include using knives to prepare food, handling hot grease from fryers, working near hot surfaces, and slipping on wet or greasy floors. In addition, certain types of machinery prohibited for use by young workers under current child labor laws are commonly found in retail establishments—including food slicers, paper balers, forklifts, dough and batter mixers, and bread cutting machines. Young workers may choose to operate unfamiliar machinery to prove responsibility, independence, or maturity, or they may be instructed to do so by an employer who is unaware of child labor laws or chooses to disregard them.

== U.S. federal and state programs ==
=== OSHA ===
The Occupational Safety and Health Administration (OSHA) within the U.S. Department of Labor (DOL) is the Federal agency with primary responsibility for setting and enforcing standards to promote safe and healthful working conditions for all workers. Employers are responsible for becoming familiar with standards applicable to their establishments and for ensuring a safe working environment.

=== U.S. Public Health Service ===
The U.S. Public Health Service has a Healthy People 2020 objective to reduce emergency department injury rates among young workers, ages 15 through 19, to 4.9 injuries/100 full-time equivalents by 2020. The rate in 2007 was 5.3 injuries/100 full-time equivalents.

=== NIOSH ===
The National Institute for Occupational Safety and Health (NIOSH) within the U.S. Centers for Disease Control and Prevention plays a lead role in efforts to reduce injuries and illnesses among working youth by conducting and supporting science to guide prevention efforts, disseminating findings, and working with others in collaborative outreach.

The NIOSH funds the National Children's Center for Rural and Agricultural Health and Safety.

=== Federal child labor laws ===
A workplace may be fully compliant with OSHA regulations and yet may place young workers at risk of injury or illness if applicable federal and state child labor laws are not followed. One study estimated that more than three-fourths of employers of young workers were unfamiliar with child labor laws. Lack of awareness of occupational safety and health laws by young workers, adults, and employers has been identified as a major obstacle to preventing injury and illness in young workers.^{[10]} The primary Federal law governing the employment of workers under age 18 is the Fair Labor Standards Act (FLSA) of 1938, which is enforced by the Wage and Hour Division of the Employment Standards Administration within DOL. Child labor provisions of the FLSA are designed to protect the educational opportunities of minors and prohibit their employment in jobs that pose safety or health risks. The FLSA does not cover all young workers. The FLSA applies to an entire business enterprise if the enterprise has annual gross revenues of $500,000 or more. Child Labor Regulation No. 3 restricts hours and specifies allowable employment activities for workers aged 14 and 15.

=== State child labor laws ===
States may also have their own child labor laws that are stricter than federal laws. If a state child labor law is less protective than federal law, or if no applicable state law exists, Federal child labor laws apply.^{[10]}

== See also ==
- Youth hearing conservation programs
- National Safety Council
