= Exposure action value =

An Exposure Action Value (EAV) or Action Value (AV) is a limit set on occupational exposure to noise where, when those values are exceeded, employers must take steps to monitor the exposure levels. These levels are measured in decibels. The American Occupational Safety and Health Administration (OSHA) set the EAV to 85 dB(A). When the eight-hour time-weighted average (TWA) reaches 85 dB(A), employers are required to administer a continuing, effective hearing conservation program. The program consists of monitoring, employee notification, observation, an audiometric testing program, hearing protectors, training programs, and record-keeping requirements.

== Purpose ==
The purpose of the EAV is to ensure that employees are not suffering from high levels of noise exposure. OSHA requires employers to take steps to reduce exposure levels when the TWA reaches 90 dB(A). The EAV is to ensure that the exposure levels do not reach 90 dB(A) or more. It is also to ensure that employees are not experiencing noise-induced hearing loss.

== Use ==
A noise dosimeter is used to measure noise exposure to employees. Dosimeters can be used to determine the TWA. If it is determined that levels of noise exposure have reached the EAV, employers are required to implement a hearing conservation program. The hearing conservation program consists of many different aspects.

The first aspect is monitoring. The employer is required to monitor noise exposure for all of its employees who may be exposed at a TWA at or above 85 dB(A). This is to identify employees for inclusion in the hearing conservation program and to enable the proper selection of hearing protectors.

The second aspect is the audiometric testing program. Employees exposed to levels at or above the EAV will undergo audiometric testing. The first test is called a baseline. It provides a standard to compare future audiometric tests. If a significant change in hearing capabilities occurs (called a standard threshold shift) greater steps must be taken to ensure the employee is protected from high levels of noise exposure.

The third aspect is the implementation of hearing protection. Employers must make hearing protection available to all employees who are exposed to noise levels of 85 dB(A) or greater. This is to be at no cost to employees. Employees can pick whichever type of hearing protection they prefer. This also requires an ongoing evaluation of the hearing protection.

The fourth aspect is a training program. The training program must cover the effects of noise on hearing, the purpose of hearing protection, and the purpose of audiometric testing.

The last aspect is record keeping. Records of employee audiometric tests must be retained for two years. This information must also be available to the employees.

== Vibration ==
Just like the Exposure Action Value or Action Value for noise, safety administrations across the world are publishing values for vibrations. As of right now, The American Occupational Safety and Health Administration has not officially published a list of appropriate, time-weighted EAV guidelines for employers to follow. However, companies in the United States are encouraged by the National Institute for Occupational Safety and Health to follow the vibration limits set up by the ACGIH, which publishes a Threshold Limit Value or TLV in their annual book of TLVs and BEIs. The goal is for employers to have these numbers to make a conscious effort to lower the amount of harmful exposure absorbed by their workers. Since the link from physical vibration to damage caused by Raynaud's phenomenon is less clearly defined between the EAV for noise and noise-induced hearing loss, an upper extreme limit Exposure Limit Value or ELV is provided as well to give a margin.

== See also ==
- Hearing impairment
- Audiometry
- Hearing Conservation Program
- Noise-induced hearing loss
