= Presbycusis =

Cumulative effect of aging on hearing

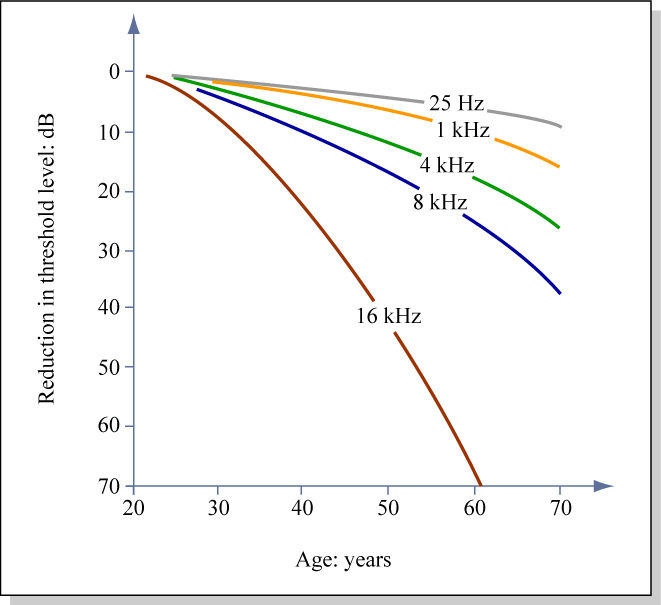
- Reduction in human hearing threshold level with age.
- Specialty: Otorhinolaryngology, speech–language pathology, geriatrics

Presbycusis (also spelled presbyacusis, from Greek πρέσβυς presbys "old" + ἄκουσις akousis "hearing"), or age-related hearing loss, is the cumulative effect of aging on hearing. It is a progressive and irreversible bilateral symmetrical age-related sensorineural hearing loss resulting from degeneration of the cochlea or associated structures of the inner ear or auditory nerves. The hearing loss is most marked at higher frequencies. Hearing loss that accumulates with age but is caused by factors other than normal aging (nosocusis and sociocusis) is not presbycusis, although differentiating the individual effects of distinct causes of hearing loss can be difficult.

The cause of presbycusis is a combination of genetics, cumulative environmental exposures and pathophysiological changes related to aging. At present there are no preventive measures known; treatment is by hearing aid or surgical implant.

Presbycusis is the most common cause of hearing loss, affecting one out of three persons by age 65, and one out of two by age 75. Presbycusis is the second most common illness next to arthritis in aged people.

Many vertebrates such as fish, birds and amphibians do not experience presbycusis in old age as they are able to regenerate their cochlear sensory cells, whereas mammals including humans have genetically lost this regenerative ability.

== Presentation ==
Hearing Loss with Age (Presbycusis)
Teenagers begin to lose the ability to hear high-pitched sounds. Beyond the age of 25, many adults cannot hear this 10-second audio clip at a frequency of 17.4 kHz.

Primary symptoms:

- sounds or speech becoming dull, muffled or attenuated
- need for increased volume on television, radio, music and other audio sources
- difficulty using the telephone
- loss of directionality of sound
- difficulty understanding speech, especially women and children
- difficulty in speech discrimination against background noise (cocktail party effect)

Secondary symptoms:

- hyperacusis, heightened sensitivity to certain volumes and frequencies of sound, resulting from "recruitment"
- tinnitus, ringing, buzzing, hissing or other sounds in the ear when no external sound is present

Usually occurs after age 50, but deterioration in hearing has been found to start very early, from about the age of 18 years. The ISO standard 7029 shows expected threshold changes due purely to age for carefully screened populations (i.e. excluding those with ear disease, noise exposure etc.), based on a meta-analysis of published data. Age affects high frequencies more than low, and men more than women. One early consequence is that even young adults may lose the ability to hear very high frequency tones above 15 or 16 kHz. Despite this, age-related hearing loss may only become noticeable later in life. The effects of age can be exacerbated by exposure to environmental noise, whether at work or in leisure time (shooting, music, etc.). This is noise-induced hearing loss (NIHL) and is distinct from presbycusis. A second exacerbating factor is exposure to ototoxic drugs and chemicals.

Over time, the detection of high-pitched sounds becomes more difficult, and speech perception is affected, particularly of sibilants and fricatives. Patients typically express a decreased ability to understand speech. Once the loss has progressed to the 2–4 kHz range, there is increased difficulty understanding consonants. Both ears tend to be affected. The impact of presbycusis on communication depends on both the severity of the condition and the communication partner.

Older adults with presbycusis often exhibit associated symptoms of social isolation, depression, anxiety, frailty and cognitive decline. The risk of having cognitive impairment increased 7 percent for every 10 dB of hearing loss at baseline. No effect of hearing aids was seen in the Lin Baltimore study.

== Causes ==
Hearing is lost gradually as the hair cells in the Corti stiffen and die.

Changes in the inner ear, middle ear, and complex changes along the nerve pathways from the ear to the brain can also affect hearing. Long-term exposure to noise and some medical conditions can also play a role. In addition, new research suggests that certain genes make some people more susceptible to hearing loss as they age. Other risk factors include preexisting noise-induced hearing loss and exposure to ototoxic medications.

== Pathophysiology ==
There are four pathological phenotypes of presbycusis:

- Sensory: characterised by degeneration of the organ of Corti, the sensory organ for hearing. Located within the scala media, it contains inner and outer hair cells with stereocilia. The outer hair cells play a significant role in the amplification of sound. Age-related hair cell degeneration is characterized by loss of stereocilia, shrinkage of hair cell soma, and reduction in outer hair cell mechanical properties, suggesting that functional decline in mechanotransduction and cochlear amplification precedes hair cell loss and contributes to age-related hearing loss. At the molecular level, hair cell aging is associated with key molecular processes, including transcriptional regulation, DNA damage/repair, autophagy, and inflammatory response, as well as those related to hair cell unique morphology and function. A 2020 study suggests that the main cause of presbycusis is the loss of inner ear sensory cells and that the main cause of this loss is noise exposure.
- Neural: characterised by degeneration of cells of the spiral ganglion.
- Strial/metabolic: characterised by atrophy of stria vascularis in all turns of cochlea. Located in the lateral wall of the cochlea, the stria vascularis contains sodium-potassium-ATPase pumps that are responsible for producing the endolymph resting potential. As individuals age, a loss of capillaries leads to the endolymphatic potential becoming harder to maintain, which brings a decrease in cochlear potential.
- Cochlear conductive: due to stiffening of the basilar membrane thus affecting its movement. This type of pathology has not been verified as contributing to presbycusis.

In addition there are two other types:

- Mixed
- Indeterminate

The shape of the audiogram categorizes abrupt high-frequency loss (sensory phenotype) or flat loss (strial phenotype).

Classically, audiograms in neural presbycusis show a moderate downward slope into higher frequencies with a gradual worsening over time. A severe loss in speech discrimination is often described, out of proportion to the threshold loss, making amplification difficult due to poor comprehension.

The audiogram associated with sensory presbycusis is thought to show a sharply sloping high-frequency loss extending beyond the speech frequency range, and clinical evaluation reveals a slow, symmetric, and bilateral progression of hearing loss.

== Diagnosis ==
Hearing loss is classified as mild, moderate, severe or profound. Pure-tone audiometry for air conduction thresholds at 250, 500, 1000, 2000, 4000, 6000 and 8000 Hz is traditionally used to classify the degree of hearing loss in each ear. Normal hearing thresholds are considered to be 25 dB sensitivity, though it has been proposed that this threshold is too high, and that 15 dB is more typical. Mild hearing loss is thresholds of 25–45 dB; moderate hearing loss is thresholds of 45–65 dB; severe hearing loss is thresholds of 65–85 dB; and profound hearing loss thresholds are greater than 85 dB.

Tinnitus occurring in only one ear should prompt the clinician to initiate further evaluation for other etiologies. In addition, the presence of a pulse-synchronous rushing sound may require additional imaging to exclude vascular disorders.

=== Otoscopy ===
A medical doctor, an otolaryngologist, or an audiologist may use an otoscope, a visual instrument inserted into the ear, to examine the external ear canal and the tympanic membrane. This also allows some inspection of the middle ear through the translucent tympanic membrane.

=== Tympanometry ===
A test administered by a medical doctor, otolaryngologist or audiologist of the tympanic membrane and middle ear function using a tympanometer, an air-pressure/sound wave instrument inserted into the ear canal. The result is a tympanogram showing ear canal volume, middle ear pressure and eardrum compliance. Normal middle ear function (Type A tympanogram) with a hearing loss may suggest presbycusis. Type B and Type C tympanograms indicate an abnormality inside the ear and therefore may have an additional effect on the hearing.

=== Laboratory studies ===
This may include a blood or other sera test for inflammatory markers such as those for autoinflammatory diseases.

=== Audiometry ===
A hearing test administered by a medical doctor, otolaryngologist (ENT) or audiologist including pure tone audiometry and speech recognition may be used to determine the extent and nature of hearing loss, and distinguish presbycusis from other kinds of hearing loss. Otoacoustic emissions and evoked response testing may be used to test for audio neuropathy. Persons with cochlear deficits fail otoacoustic emissions testing, while persons with 8th cranial nerve (vestibulocochlear nerve) deficits fail auditory brainstem response testing. The diagnosis of a sensorineural pattern hearing loss is made through audiometry, which shows a significant hearing loss without the "air-bone gap" that is characteristic of conductive hearing disturbances. In other words, air conduction is equal to bone conduction.

=== Magnetic resonance imaging (MRI) ===
As part of differential diagnosis, an MRI scan may be done to check for vascular anomalies, tumors, and structural problems like enlarged mastoids. MRI and other types of scan cannot directly detect or measure age-related hearing loss.

== Treatment ==
At present, presbycusis, being primarily sensorineural in nature, cannot be prevented, ameliorated or cured. Treatment options fall into three categories: pharmacological, surgical and management.

- There are no approved or recommended pharmaceutical treatments for presbycusis.

=== Cochlear implant ===
In cases of severe or profound hearing loss, a surgical cochlear implant is possible. This is an electronic device that replaces the cochlea of the inner ear. The implant has two main components. The outside component is generally worn behind the ear. This component, the sound processor, contains microphones, electronics that include digital signal processor (DSP) chips, battery, and a coil that transmits a signal to the implant across the skin. The inside component, the actual implant, has a coil to receive signals, electronics, and an array of electrodes which is placed into the cochlea, which stimulate the cochlear nerve.

Electrodes are typically inserted through the round window of the cochlea, into the fluid-filled scala tympani. They stimulate the peripheral axons of the primary auditory neurons, which then send information to the brain via the auditory nerve. The cochlea is tonotopically mapped in a spiral fashion, with lower frequencies localizing at the apex of the cochlea, and high frequencies at the base of the cochlea, near the oval and round windows. With age, comes a loss in distinction of frequencies, especially higher ones. The electrodes of the implant are designed to stimulate the array of nerve fibers that previously responded to different frequencies accurately. Due to spatial constraints, the cochlear implant may not be inserted all the way into the cochlear apex. It provides a different kind of sound spectrum than natural hearing, but may enable the recipient to recognize speech and environmental sounds.

=== Middle ear implants ===
These are surgically implanted hearing aids inserted onto the middle ear. These aids work by directly vibrating the ossicles, and are cosmetically favorable due to their hidden nature.

=== Management ===
- Hearing aids help improve hearing of many elderly. Hearing aids can now be tuned to specific frequency ranges of hearing loss.
- Aural rehabilitation for the affected person and their communication partners may reduce the impact on communication. Techniques such as squarely facing the affected person, enunciating, ensuring adequate light, minimizing noise in the environment, and using contextual cues are used to improve comprehension.

=== Neuromodulation and presbycusis ===
Recent animal studies have explored the use of non-invasive and minimally invasive electrical stimulation techniques to mitigate aspects of age-related hearing decline. Approaches such as anodal direct current stimulation, epidural stimulation, and surface cortical stimulation of the auditory cortex have been shown to help preserve auditory pathways, stabilize hearing thresholds, and reduce cochlear markers of aging in rodent models. Although these findings are preliminary, they suggest that targeted neuromodulation may support auditory function during aging and represent a potential future avenue for therapeutic research

== Popular culture ==
Abilities of young people to hear high frequency tones inaudible to those over 25 or so has led to the development of technologies to disperse groups of young people around shops (The Mosquito), and development of a cell phone ringtone, Teen Buzz, for students to use in school, that older people cannot hear. In September 2006 this technique was used to make a dance track called 'Buzzin'. The track had two melodies, one that everyone could hear and one that only younger people could hear.

== Animals ==
Many vertebrates such as fish, birds and amphibians do not experience presbycusis in old age as they are able to regenerate their cochlear sensory cells, whereas mammals including humans have genetically lost this ability. A number of laboratories worldwide are conducting comparative studies of birds and mammals that aim to find the differences in regenerative capacity, with a view to developing new treatments for human hearing problems.

== See also ==
- Presbyopia – age-related degeneration of the eyes
