= Recruitment (medicine) =

Condition of the inner ear

Recruitment, in medicine, is a physical condition of the inner ear that leads to reduced tolerance of loudness. It commonly occurs in individuals who suffer hearing loss due to cochlear damage. While low-magnitude sounds cannot be heard in the affected ear(s), the perceived loudness increases over-proportionally with sound volume once the auditory threshold has been overcome. This can result in a (seemingly paradoxical) reduced tolerance to loudness, as loud sounds may be perceived louder than normal.

In those with hearing impairment, the presence of a recruitment phenomenon points towards a cochlear dysfunction, while its absence (also referred to as negative recruitment) indicates a source outside the cochlea (e.g. cochlear nerve injury, tympanic membrane rupture).

A source of frustration for people with sensorineural hearing loss (SNHL) is reduced speech intelligibility. The common lament "I can hear, but I cannot understand," underscores this point. This problem relates to abnormal frequency resolution and aberrant patterns of growth in loudness, each of which reduces speech intelligibility under challenging listening conditions, such as noisy surroundings. SNHL also imposes severe constraints on the dynamic range of perceived sound. For normal listeners, the dynamic range from sensing soft sounds to the loudest tolerable noise is more than 100 dB. Within this wide dynamic range of hearing lies an approximately 35-dB dynamic range of conversational speech.

In contrast, the dynamic range of patients with SNHL is often narrowed by both an increase in the threshold of audibility and a lowering of the ceiling of tolerance to high-intensity sounds.

This compaction of dynamic range leads to recruitment, an abnormal growth in loudness as sound intensity increases. What sounds normal for someone with normal hearing may be too soft for someone with recruitment, and what is moderately loud for someone with normal hearing is intolerably loud for the patient with recruitment. In effect, the range of sound intensity that a patient with recruitment can tolerate is much narrower. Further adding to the difficulty, recruitment is observed in those frequencies that are most impaired—in the high frequencies, which also carry critical information for speech understanding.

Recruitment thus remains one of the principal challenges of hearing aid rehabilitation, and it is responsible for a common phenomenon most clinicians who deal with hearing loss have witnessed or experienced: at average speaking levels, an individual with recruitment may ask a speaker to talk more loudly, yet with even a slight increase in intensity, the speech becomes intolerably loud, and the speaker is told not to shout. Although many hearing aids can be programmed to prevent sound from amplifying into a range that is uncomfortable, even the most advanced aids cannot fully replicate the complex, nonlinear response patterns of a healthy cochlea.

== See also ==
- Hyperacusis
