= Hearing loss =

Partial or total inability to hear

- Other names: Deaf or hard of hearing; anakusis or anacusis is total deafness
- Specialty: Otorhinolaryngology, audiology
- Symptoms: Decreased ability to hear
- Complications: Social isolation, dementia
- Types: Conductive, sensorineural, and mixed hearing loss, central auditory dysfunction
- Causes: Genetics, aging, exposure to noise, some infections, birth complications, trauma to the ear, certain medications or toxins
- Diagnostic method: Hearing tests
- Prevention: Immunization, proper care around pregnancy, avoiding loud noise, avoiding certain medications
- Treatment: Hearing aids, sign language, cochlear implants, closed captioning, subtitles
- Frequency: 1.33 billion / 18.5% (2015)

Hearing loss is either a partial inability to hear, or a total inability termed deafness. Hearing loss may be present at birth or acquired at any time afterwards. Hearing loss may occur in one or both ears. In children, hearing problems can affect the ability to acquire spoken language. In adults, it can create difficulties with social interaction and at work. Hearing loss can be temporary or permanent. Hearing loss related to age usually affects both ears and is due to cochlear hair cell loss. In some people, particularly older people, hearing loss can result in isolation and loneliness.

Hearing loss may be caused by a number of factors, including: genetics, ageing, exposure to noise, some infections, birth complications, trauma to the ear or brain, and certain medications or toxins. A common condition that results in hearing loss is chronic ear infections. Certain infections during pregnancy, such as cytomegalovirus, syphilis and rubella, may also cause hearing loss in the child. Hearing loss is diagnosed when hearing testing finds that a person is unable to hear 25 decibels in at least one ear. Testing for poor hearing is recommended for all newborns. Hearing loss can be categorized as minimal/slight (15 to 25 dB), mild (25 to 40 dB), moderate (41 to 55 dB), moderate-severe (56 to 70 dB), severe (71 to 90 dB), or profound (greater than 90 dB). There are three main types of hearing loss: conductive hearing loss, sensorineural hearing loss, and mixed hearing loss.

About half of hearing loss globally is preventable through public health measures. Such practices include immunization, proper care around pregnancy, avoiding loud noise, and avoiding certain medications. The World Health Organization recommends that young people limit exposure to loud sounds and the use of personal audio players to an hour a day to limit noise exposure. Early identification and support are particularly important in children. For many, hearing aids, sign language, cochlear implants and subtitles are useful. Lip reading is another useful skill some develop. Access to hearing aids, however, is limited in many areas of the world.

== Definition ==
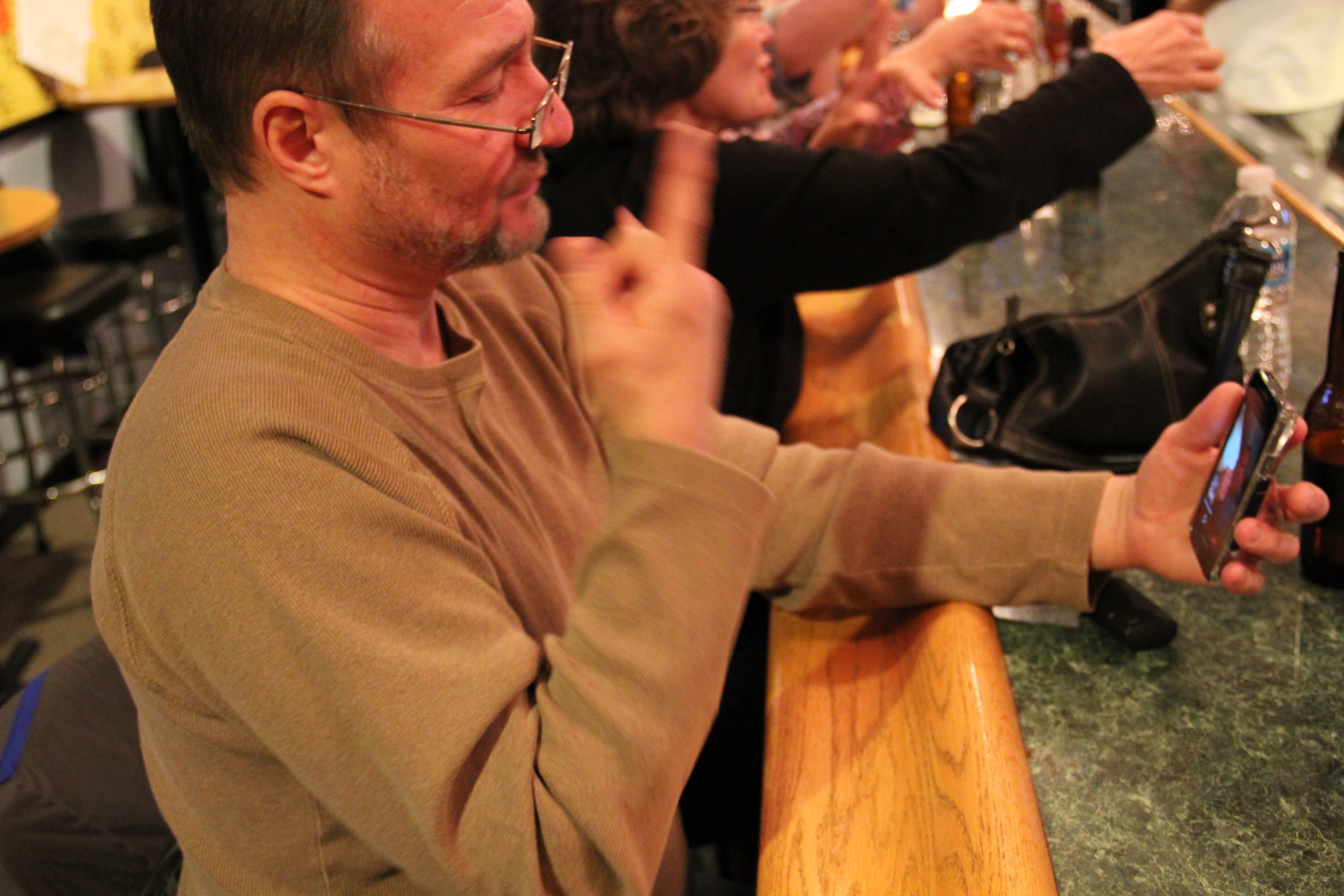
A deaf person using a camera-equipped smartphone to communicate in sign language

- Hearing loss is defined as diminished acuity to sounds which would otherwise be heard normally. The terms hearing impaired or hard of hearing are usually reserved for people who have a relative inability to hear sound in the speech frequencies. Hearing loss occurs when sound waves enter the ears and damage the sensitive tissues The severity of hearing loss is categorized according to the increase in intensity of sound above the usual level required for the listener to detect it.
- Deafness is defined as a degree of loss such that a person is unable to understand speech, even in the presence of amplification. In profound deafness, even the highest intensity sounds produced by an audiometer (an instrument used to measure hearing by producing pure tone sounds through a range of frequencies) may not be detected. In total deafness, no sounds at all, regardless of amplification or method of production, can be heard.
- Speech perception is another aspect of hearing which involves the perceived clarity of a word rather than the intensity of sound made by the word. In humans, this is usually measured with speech discrimination tests, which measure not only the ability to detect sound, but also the ability to understand speech. There are very rare types of hearing loss that affect speech discrimination alone. One example is auditory neuropathy, a variety of hearing loss in which the outer hair cells of the cochlea are intact and functioning, but sound information is not faithfully transmitted by the auditory nerve to the brain.

Use of the terms "hearing impaired", "deaf-mute", or "deaf and dumb" to describe deaf and hard-of-hearing people is discouraged by many in the deaf community as well as advocacy organizations, as they are offensive to many deaf and hard-of-hearing people.

=== Hearing standards ===
Human hearing extends in frequency from 20 to 20,000 Hz, and in intensity from 0 dB to 120 dB HL or more. 0 dB does not represent the absence of sound, but rather the softest sound an average unimpaired human ear can hear; some people can hear down to −5 or even −10 dB. Sound is generally uncomfortably loud above 90 dB and 115 dB represents the threshold of pain. The ear does not hear all frequencies equally well: hearing sensitivity peaks around 3,000 Hz. There are many qualities of human hearing besides frequency range and intensity that cannot easily be measured quantitatively. However, for many practical purposes, normal hearing is defined by a frequency versus intensity graph, or audiogram, charting sensitivity thresholds of hearing at defined frequencies. Due to the cumulative impact of age and exposure to noise and other acoustic insults, 'typical' hearing may not be normal.

== Signs and symptoms ==
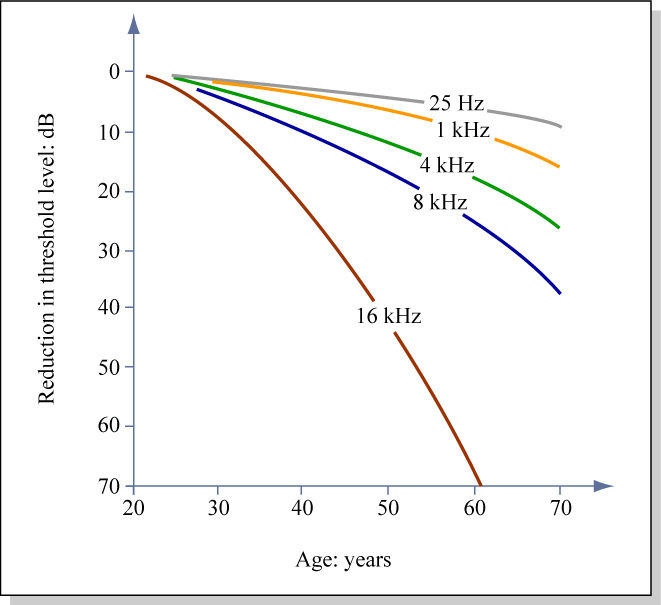
Reduction in human hearing threshold level with age.

The presentation is as follows:

- difficulty using the telephone
- loss of sound localization
- difficulty understanding speech, especially of children and women whose voices are of a higher frequency.
- difficulty understanding speech in the presence of background noise (cocktail party effect)
- sounds or speech sounding dull, muffled or attenuated
- need for increased volume on television, radio, music and other audio sources

Hearing loss is sensory, but may have accompanying symptoms:

- pain or pressure in the ears
- a blocked feeling

There may also be accompanying secondary symptoms:

- hyperacusis, heightened sensitivity with accompanying auditory pain to certain intensities and frequencies of sound, sometimes defined as "auditory recruitment"
- tinnitus, ringing, buzzing, hissing or other sounds in the ear when no external sound is present
- vertigo and disequilibrium
- tympanophonia, also known as autophonia, abnormal hearing of one's own voice and respiratory sounds, usually as a result of a patulous (a constantly open) eustachian tube or dehiscent superior semicircular canals
- disturbances of facial movement (indicating a possible tumour or stroke) or in persons with Bell's palsy

=== Complications ===
Hearing loss is associated with Alzheimer's disease and dementia. The risk increases with the degree of hearing loss. A systematic review and meta analysis assessed the link between hearing loss and dementia subtypes. Hearing loss was linked to an increased risk of mild to severe cognitive problems, including mild cognitive impairment and Alzheimer's disease. Hearing loss was not linked to an increased risk of vascular dementia. There are several hypotheses, including cognitive resources being redistributed to hearing and social isolation from hearing loss, having a negative effect. According to preliminary data, hearing aid usage can slow down the decline in cognitive functions.

Hearing loss is responsible for causing thalamocortical dysrhythmia in the brain, which is a cause for several neurological disorders, including tinnitus and visual snow syndrome.

==== Cognitive decline ====
Hearing loss is an increasing concern, especially in aging populations. The prevalence of hearing loss increases about two-fold for each decade increase in age after age 40. While the secular trend might decrease individual level risk of developing hearing loss, the prevalence of hearing loss is expected to rise due to the aging population in the US. Another concern about the aging process is cognitive decline, which may progress to mild cognitive impairment and eventually dementia. The association between hearing loss and cognitive decline has been studied in various research settings. Despite the variability in study design and protocols, the majority of these studies have found a consistent association between age-related hearing loss and cognitive decline, cognitive impairment, and dementia. The association between age-related hearing loss and Alzheimer's disease was found to be nonsignificant. This finding supports the hypothesis that hearing loss is associated with dementia independent of Alzheimer's pathology. There are several hypotheses about the underlying causal mechanism for age-related hearing loss and cognitive decline. One hypothesis is that this association can be explained by common etiology or shared neurobiological pathology with decline in other physiological system. Another possible cognitive mechanism emphasize on individual's cognitive load. As people develop hearing loss with aging, the cognitive load demanded by auditory perception increases, which may lead to changes in brain structure and eventually to dementia. One other hypothesis suggests that the association between hearing loss and cognitive decline is mediated through various psychosocial factors, such as decrease in social contact and increase in social isolation. Findings on the association between hearing loss and dementia have significant public health implications, since about 9% of dementia cases are associated with hearing loss.

==== Falls ====
Those with hearing loss are at a higher risk of falling. There is also a potential dose–response relationship between hearing loss and falls—greater severity of hearing loss is associated with increased difficulties in postural control and increased prevalence of falls. The underlying causal link between the association of hearing loss and falls is yet to be elucidated. Several hypotheses indicate that there may be a common process between the decline in auditory system and the increase in incident falls, driven by physiological, cognitive, and behavioral factors. This evidence suggests that treating hearing loss has the potential to increase health-related quality of life in older adults. Falls have important health implications, especially for an aging population, where they can lead to significant morbidity and mortality. Elderly people are particularly vulnerable to the consequences of injuries caused by falls, since older individuals typically have greater bone fragility and poorer protective reflexes. Fall-related injury can also lead to burdens on the financial and health care systems. In literature, age-related hearing loss is found to be significantly associated with incident falls.

==== Depression ====
Hearing loss can contribute to a decrease in health-related quality of life, an increase in social isolation, and a decline in social engagement, which are all risk factors for developing depression symptoms. Depression is one of the leading causes of morbidity and mortality worldwide. In older adults, the suicide rate is higher than it is for younger adults, and more suicide cases are attributable to depression. Some chronic diseases are found to be significantly associated with risk of developing depression, such as coronary heart disease, pulmonary disease, vision loss and hearing loss.

==== Spoken language ability ====
Prelingual deafness is profound hearing loss that is sustained before the acquisition of language, which can occur due to a congenital condition or through hearing loss before birth or in early infancy. Prelingual deafness impairs an individual's ability to acquire a spoken language in children, but deaf children can acquire spoken language through support from cochlear implants (sometimes combined with hearing aids). Non-signing (hearing) parents of deaf babies (90–95% of cases) usually go with oral approach without the support of sign language, as these families lack previous experience with sign language and cannot competently provide it to their children without learning it themselves. This may in some cases (late implantation or not sufficient benefit from cochlear implants) bring the risk of language deprivation for the deaf baby because the deaf baby would not have a sign language if the child is unable to acquire spoken language successfully. The 5–10% of cases of deaf babies born into signing families have the potential to develop age-appropriate language due to early exposure to a sign language by sign-competent parents. Thus, they have the potential to meet language milestones in sign language instead of spoken language.

Post-lingual deafness is hearing loss that is sustained after the acquisition of language, which can occur due to disease, trauma, or as a side-effect of a medicine. Typically, hearing loss is gradual and often detected by family and friends of affected individuals long before the patients themselves will acknowledge the disability. Post-lingual deafness is far more common than pre-lingual deafness. Those who lose their hearing later in life, such as in late adolescence or adulthood, face their own challenges, living with the adaptations that allow them to live independently.

== Causes ==
Hearing loss has multiple causes, including ageing, genetics, perinatal problems, and acquired causes such as noise and disease. For some kinds of hearing loss, the cause may be classified as of unknown cause.

There is a progressive loss of ability to hear high frequencies with aging, known as presbycusis. For men, this can start as early as 25, and for women at 30. Although genetically variable, it is a normal concomitant of ageing. It is distinct from hearing losses caused by noise exposure, toxins or disease agents. Common conditions that can increase the risk of hearing loss in elderly people are high blood pressure, diabetes (hearing loss in diabetes), or the use of certain medications harmful to the ear. While everyone loses hearing with age, the amount and type of hearing loss is variable.

Noise-induced hearing loss (NIHL), also known as acoustic trauma, typically manifests as elevated hearing thresholds (i.e., less sensitivity or muting). Noise exposure is the cause of approximately half of all cases of hearing loss, causing some degree of problems in 5% of the population globally. The majority of hearing loss is not due to age, but due to noise exposure. Various governmental, industry and standards organizations set noise standards. Many people are unaware of the presence of environmental sound at damaging levels or of the level at which sound becomes harmful. Common sources of damaging noise levels include car stereos, children's toys, motor vehicles, crowds, lawn and maintenance equipment, power tools, gun use, musical instruments, and even hair dryers. Noise damage is cumulative; all sources of damage must be considered to assess risk. In the US, 12.5% of children aged 6–19 years have permanent hearing damage from excessive noise exposure. The World Health Organization estimates that half of those between 12 and 35 are at risk from using personal audio devices that are too loud. Hearing loss in adolescents may be caused by loud noise from toys, music by headphones, and concerts or events.

Hearing loss can be inherited. Around 75–80% of all these cases are inherited by recessive genes, 20–25% are inherited by dominant genes, 1–2% are inherited by X-linked patterns, and fewer than 1% are inherited by mitochondrial inheritance. Syndromic deafness occurs when there are other signs or medical problems aside from deafness in an individual, such as Usher syndrome, Stickler syndrome, Waardenburg syndrome, Alport's syndrome, and neurofibromatosis type 2. Nonsyndromic deafness occurs when there are no other signs or medical problems associated with the deafness in an individual.

Fetal alcohol spectrum disorders are reported to cause hearing loss in up to 64% of infants born to alcoholic mothers, from the ototoxic effect on the developing fetus, plus malnutrition during pregnancy from the excess alcohol intake. Premature birth can be associated with sensorineural hearing loss because of an increased risk of hypoxia, hyperbilirubinaemia, ototoxic medication, and infection, as well as noise exposure in the neonatal units. Hearing loss in premature babies is often discovered far later than similar hearing loss would be in a full-term baby because, normally, babies are given a hearing test within 48 hours of birth. Doctors must wait until the premature baby is medically stable before testing hearing, which can be months after birth. The risk of hearing loss is greatest for those weighing less than 1500 g at birth.

Disorders responsible for hearing loss include auditory neuropathy, Down syndrome, Charcot–Marie–Tooth disease variant 1E, autoimmune disease, multiple sclerosis, meningitis, cholesteatoma, otosclerosis, perilymph fistula, Ménière's disease, recurring ear infections, strokes, superior semicircular canal dehiscence, Pierre Robin, Treacher-Collins, Usher Syndrome, Pendred Syndrome, and Turner syndrome, syphilis, vestibular schwannoma, and viral infections such as measles, mumps, congenital rubella (also called German measles) syndrome, several varieties of herpes viruses, HIV/AIDS, and West Nile virus.

Some medications may reversibly or irreversibly affect hearing. These medications are considered ototoxic. This includes loop diuretics such as furosemide and bumetanide, non-steroidal anti-inflammatory drugs (NSAIDs), both over-the-counter (aspirin, ibuprofen, naproxen) as well as prescription (celecoxib, diclofenac, etc.), paracetamol, quinine, and macrolide antibiotics. Others may cause permanent hearing loss. The most important group is the aminoglycosides (main member gentamicin) and platinum based chemotherapeutics such as cisplatin and carboplatin.

In addition to medications, hearing loss can also result from specific chemicals in the environment: metals, such as lead; solvents, such as toluene (found in crude oil, gasoline and automobile exhaust, for example); and asphyxiants. Combined with noise, these ototoxic chemicals have an additive effect on a person's hearing loss. Hearing loss due to chemicals starts in the high-frequency range and is irreversible. It damages the cochlea with lesions and degrades central portions of the auditory system. For some ototoxic chemical exposures, particularly styrene, the risk of hearing loss can be higher than being exposed to noise alone. The effects are greatest when the combined exposure includes impulse noise. A 2018 informational bulletin by the US Occupational Safety and Health Administration (OSHA) and the National Institute for Occupational Safety and Health (NIOSH) introduces the issue, provides examples of ototoxic chemicals, lists the industries and occupations at risk and provides prevention information.

There can be damage either to the ear, whether the external or middle ear, to the cochlea, or to the brain centers that process the aural information conveyed by the ears. Damage to the middle ear may include fracture and discontinuity of the ossicular chain. Damage to the inner ear (cochlea) may be caused by temporal bone fracture. People who sustain a head injury are especially vulnerable to hearing loss or tinnitus, either temporary or permanent.

== Pathophysiology ==
How sounds make their way from the source to the brain

Sound waves reach the outer ear and are conducted down the ear canal to the eardrum, causing it to vibrate. The vibrations are transferred by the 3 tiny ear bones of the middle ear to the fluid in the inner ear. The fluid moves hair cells (stereocilia), and their movement generates nerve impulses which are then taken to the brain by the cochlear nerve. The auditory nerve takes the impulses to the brainstem, which sends the impulses to the midbrain. Finally, the signal goes to the auditory cortex of the temporal lobe to be interpreted as sound.

Hearing loss is most commonly caused by long-term exposure to loud noises, from recreation or from work, that damage the hair cells, which do not grow back on their own.

Older people may lose their hearing from prolonged exposure to noise, changes in the inner ear, the middle ear, or along the nerves from the ear to the brain.

== Diagnosis ==
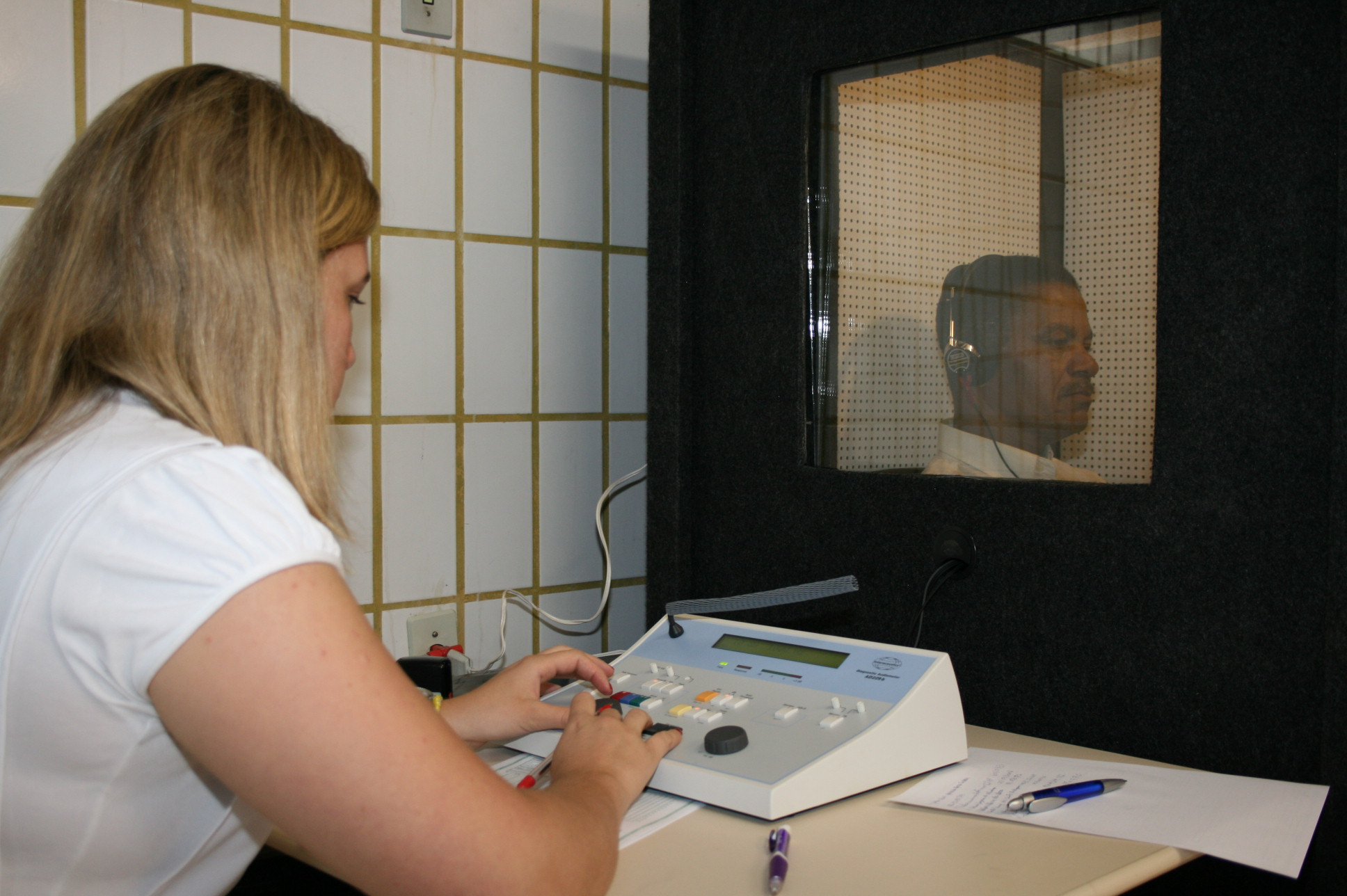
An audiologist conducting an audiometric hearing test in a sound-proof testing booth

Identification of a hearing loss is usually conducted by a general practitioner medical doctor, otolaryngologist, certified and licensed audiologist, school or industrial audiometrist, or other audiometric technician. Diagnosis of the cause of a hearing loss is carried out by a specialist physician (audiovestibular physician) or otorhinolaryngologist.

Hearing loss is generally measured by playing generated or recorded sounds and determining whether the person can hear them. Hearing sensitivity varies according to the frequency of sounds. To take this into account, hearing sensitivity can be measured for a range of frequencies and plotted on an audiogram. Another method for quantifying hearing loss is a hearing test using a mobile application or hearing aid application, which includes a hearing test. Hearing diagnosis using mobile application is similar to the audiometry procedure. Audiograms, obtained using mobile applications, can be used to adjust hearing aid applications. Another method for quantifying hearing loss is a speech-in-noise test. which gives an indication of how well one can understand speech in a noisy environment. Otoacoustic emissions test is an objective hearing test that may be administered to toddlers and children too young to cooperate in a conventional hearing test. Auditory brainstem response testing is an electrophysiological test used to test for hearing deficits caused by pathology within the ear, the cochlear nerve, and also within the brainstem.

A case history (usually a written form, with a questionnaire) can provide valuable information about the context of the hearing loss, and indicate what kind of diagnostic procedures to employ. Examinations include otoscopy, tympanometry, and differential testing with the Weber, Rinne, Bing and Schwabach tests. In case of infection or inflammation, blood or other bodily fluids may be submitted for laboratory analysis. MRI and CT scans can be useful to identify the pathology of many causes of hearing loss.

Hearing loss is categorized by severity, type, and configuration. Furthermore, a hearing loss may exist in only one ear (unilateral) or in both ears (bilateral). Hearing loss can be temporary or permanent, sudden or progressive. The severity of a hearing loss is ranked according to ranges of nominal thresholds in which a sound must be so it can be detected by an individual. It is measured in decibels of hearing loss, or dB HL. There are three main types of hearing loss: conductive hearing loss, sensorineural hearing loss, and mixed hearing loss. An additional problem which is increasingly recognised is auditory processing disorder, which is not a hearing loss as such but a difficulty perceiving sound. The shape of an audiogram shows the relative configuration of the hearing loss, such as a Carhart notch for otosclerosis, 'noise' notch for noise-induced damage, high frequency rolloff for presbycusis, or a flat audiogram for conductive hearing loss. In conjunction with speech audiometry, it may indicate central auditory processing disorder, or the presence of a schwannoma or other tumor.

People with unilateral hearing loss or single-sided deafness (SSD) have difficulty in hearing conversation on their impaired side, localizing sound, and understanding speech in the presence of background noise. One reason for the hearing problems these patients often experience is due to the head shadow effect.

Idiopathic sudden hearing loss is a condition where a person as an immediate decrease in the sensitivity of their sensorineural hearing that does not have a known cause. This type of loss is usually only on one side (unilateral), and the severity of the loss varies. A common threshold of a "loss of at least 30 dB in three connected frequencies within 72 hours" is sometimes used; however, there is no universal definition or international consensus for diagnosing idiopathic sudden hearing loss.

== Prevention ==
It is estimated that half of the cases of hearing loss are preventable. About 60% of hearing loss in children under the age of 15 can be avoided. There are several effective preventative strategies, including: immunization against rubella to prevent congenital rubella syndrome, immunization against H. influenza and S. pneumoniae to reduce cases of meningitis, and avoiding or protecting against excessive noise exposure. The World Health Organization also recommends immunization against measles, mumps, and meningitis, efforts to prevent premature birth, and avoidance of certain medication as prevention. World Hearing Day is a yearly event to promote actions to prevent hearing damage.

Avoiding exposure to loud noise can help prevent noise-induced hearing loss. 18% of adults exposed to loud noise at work for five years or more report hearing loss in both ears as compared to 5.5% of adults who were not exposed to loud noise at work. Different programs exist for specific populations such as school-age children, adolescents and workers. But the HPD (without individual selection, training and fit testing) does not significantly reduce the risk of hearing loss. The use of antioxidants is being studied for the prevention of noise-induced hearing loss, particularly for scenarios in which noise exposure cannot be reduced, such as during military operations.

=== Workplace noise regulation ===
Noise is widely recognized as an occupational hazard. In the United States, the National Institute for Occupational Safety and Health (NIOSH) and the Occupational Safety and Health Administration (OSHA) work together to provide standards and enforcement on workplace noise levels. The hierarchy of hazard controls demonstrates the different levels of controls to reduce or eliminate exposure to noise and prevent hearing loss, including engineering controls and personal protective equipment (PPE). Other programs and initiative have been created to prevent hearing loss in the workplace. For example, the Safe-in-Sound Award was created to recognize organizations that can demonstrate results of successful noise control and other interventions. Additionally, the Buy Quiet program was created to encourage employers to purchase quieter machinery and tools. By purchasing less noisy power tools like those found on the NIOSH Power Tools Database and limiting exposure to ototoxic chemicals, great strides can be made in preventing hearing loss.

Companies can also provide personal hearing protector devices tailored to both the worker and the type of employment. Some hearing protectors universally block out all noise, and some allow for certain noises to be heard. Workers are more likely to wear hearing protector devices when they are properly fitted.

Often, interventions to prevent noise-induced hearing loss have many components. A 2017 Cochrane review found that stricter legislation might reduce noise levels. Providing workers with information on their sound exposure levels was not shown to decrease noise exposure. Ear protection, when used correctly, can reduce noise to safer levels. Often, providing them is not sufficient to prevent hearing loss. Engineering noise out and other solutions, such as proper maintenance of equipment, can lead to noise reduction, but further field studies on resulting noise exposures following such interventions are needed. Other possible solutions include improved enforcement of existing legislation and better implementation of well-designed prevention programs, which have not yet been proven conclusively to be effective. The Cochrane Review concluded that further research could modify what is now regarding the effectiveness of the evaluated interventions.

The Institute for Occupational Safety and Health of the German Social Accident Insurance has created a hearing loss calculator based on the ISO 1999 model for studying threshold shift in relatively homogeneous groups of people, such as workers with the same type of job. The ISO 1999 model estimates how much hearing loss in a group can be ascribed to age and noise exposure. The result is calculated via an algebraic equation that uses the A-weighted sound exposure level, how many years the people were exposed to this noise, how old the people are, and their sex. The model's estimations are only useful for those without hearing loss due to non-job-related exposure and can be used for prevention activities.

=== Screening ===
The United States Preventive Services Task Force recommends neonatal hearing screening for all newborns, as the first three years of life are believed to be the most important for language development. Universal neonatal hearing screenings have now been widely implemented across the U.S., with rates of newborn screening increasing from less than 3% in the early 1990s to 98% in 2009. Newborns whose screening reveals a high index of suspicion of hearing loss are referred for additional diagnostic testing to provide early intervention and access to language.The American Academy of Pediatrics advises that children should have their hearing tested several times throughout their schooling:

- When they enter school
- At ages 6, 8, and 10
- At least once during middle school
- At least once during high school

While the American College of Physicians indicated that there is not enough evidence to determine the utility of screening in adults over 50 years old who do not have any symptoms, the American Language, Speech Pathology and Hearing Association recommends that adults should be screened at least every decade through age 50 and at three-year intervals thereafter, to minimize the detrimental effects of the untreated condition on quality of life. For the same reason, the US Office of Disease Prevention and Health Promotion included as one of Healthy People 2020 objectives: to increase the proportion of persons who have had a hearing examination.

== Management ==
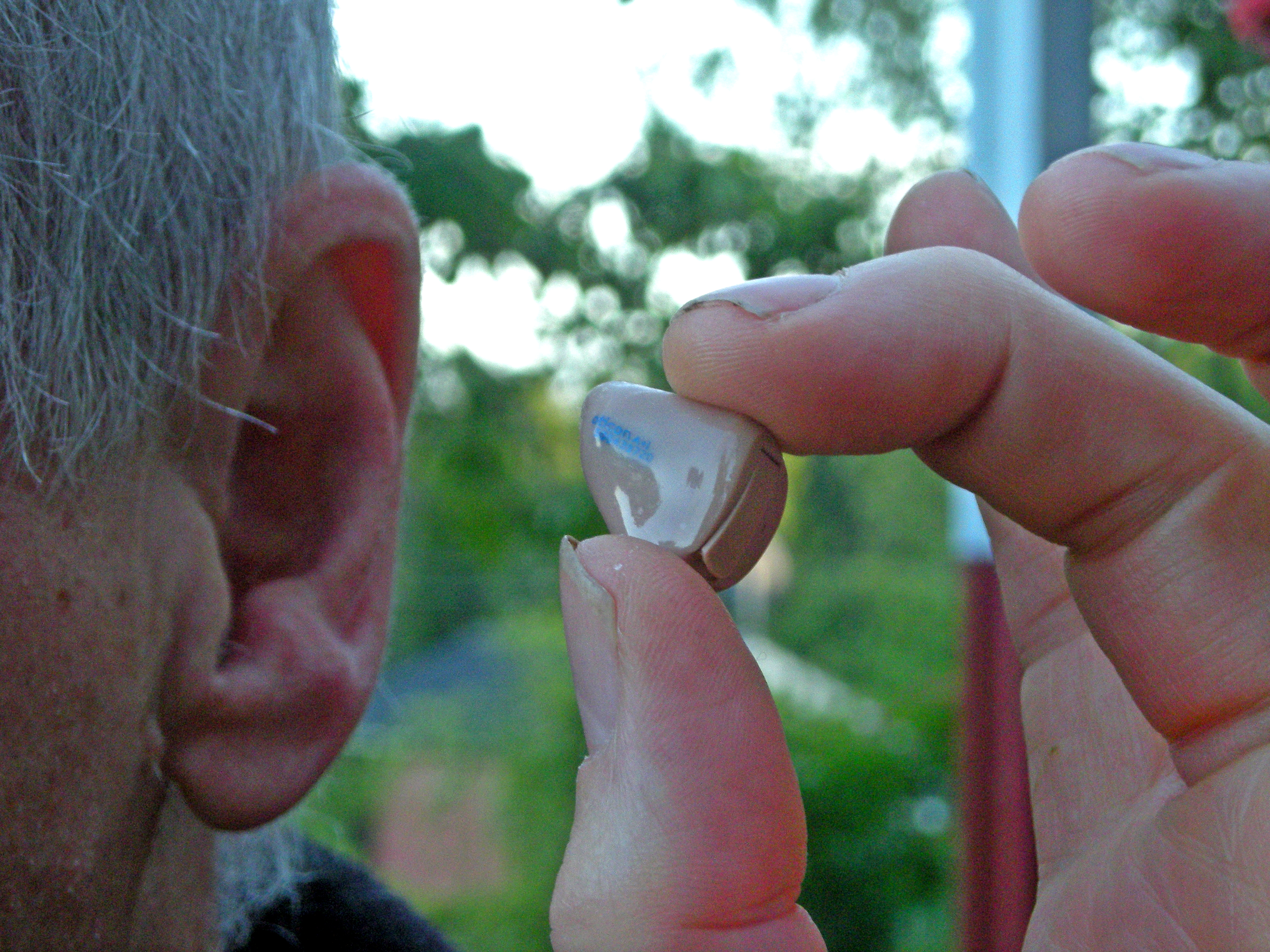
An in-the-canal hearing aid

Management depends on the specific cause, if known, as well as the extent, type, and configuration of the hearing loss. Sudden hearing loss due to an underlying nerve problem may be treated with corticosteroids.

Most hearing loss that results from age and noise is progressive and irreversible, and there are currently no approved or recommended treatments. A few specific kinds of hearing loss are amenable to surgical treatment. In other cases, treatment is addressed to underlying pathologies, but any hearing loss incurred may be permanent. Some management options include hearing aids, cochlear implants, middle ear implants, assistive technology, and closed captioning; in movie theaters, a Hearing Impaired (HI) audio track may be available via headphones to better hear dialog.

This choice depends on the severity and type of hearing loss and personal preference. Hearing aid applications are one of the options for hearing loss management. For people with bilateral hearing loss, it is not clear if bilateral hearing aids (hearing aids in both ears) are better than a unilateral hearing aid (hearing aid in one ear).

=== Idiopathic sudden hearing loss ===
For people with idiopathic sudden hearing loss, various treatment approaches have been suggested that are usually based on the suspected cause of the sudden hearing loss. Treatment approaches may include corticosteroid medications, rheological drugs, vasodilators, anesthetics, and other medications chosen based on the suspected underlying pathology that caused the sudden hearing loss. The evidence supporting most treatment options for idiopathic sudden hearing loss is very weak, and the adverse effects of these different medications are a consideration when deciding on a treatment approach.

== Epidemiology ==
Disability-adjusted life year for hearing loss (adult onset) per 100,000 inhabitants in 2004: no data <250 250–295 295–340 340–385 385–430 430–475 / 475–520 520–565 565–610 610–655 655–700 >700

Globally, hearing loss affects about 70% of the population to some degree. It caused moderate to severe disability in 124.2 million people as of 2004 (107.9 million of whom are in low and middle-income countries). Of these 65 million acquired the condition during childhood. At birth ~3 per 1000 in developed countries and more than 6 per 1000 in developing countries have hearing problems.

Hearing loss increases with age. In those between 20 and 35, the rate of hearing loss is 3% while in those 44 to 55, it is 11% and in those 65 to 85, it is 43%.

A 2017 report by the World Health Organization estimated the costs of unaddressed hearing loss and the cost-effectiveness of interventions, for the healthcare sector, the education sector, and as broad societal costs. Globally, the annual cost of unaddressed hearing loss was estimated to be in the range of $750–790 billion international dollars.

The International Organization for Standardization (ISO) developed the ISO 1999 standards for the estimation of hearing thresholds and noise-induced hearing loss. They used data from two noise and hearing study databases, one presented by Burns and Robinson (Hearing and Noise in Industry, Her Majesty's Stationery Office, London, 1970) and by Passchier-Vermeer (1968). As race are some of the factors that can affect the expected distribution of pure-tone hearing thresholds several other national or regional datasets exist, from Sweden, Norway, South Korea, the United States and Spain.

In the United States, hearing is one of the health outcomes measured by the National Health and Nutrition Examination Survey (NHANES), a survey research program conducted by the National Center for Health Statistics. It examines health and nutritional status of adults and children in the United States. Data from the United States in 2011–2012 found that rates of hearing loss have declined among adults aged 20 to 69 years, when compared with the results from an earlier time period (1999–2004). It also found that adult hearing loss is associated with increasing age, sex, ethnicity, educational level, and noise exposure. Nearly one in four adults had audiometric results suggesting noise-induced hearing loss. Almost one in four adults who reported excellent or good hearing had a similar pattern (5.5% on both sides and 18% on one side). Among people who reported exposure to loud noise at work, almost one-third had such changes.

== Social and cultural aspects ==
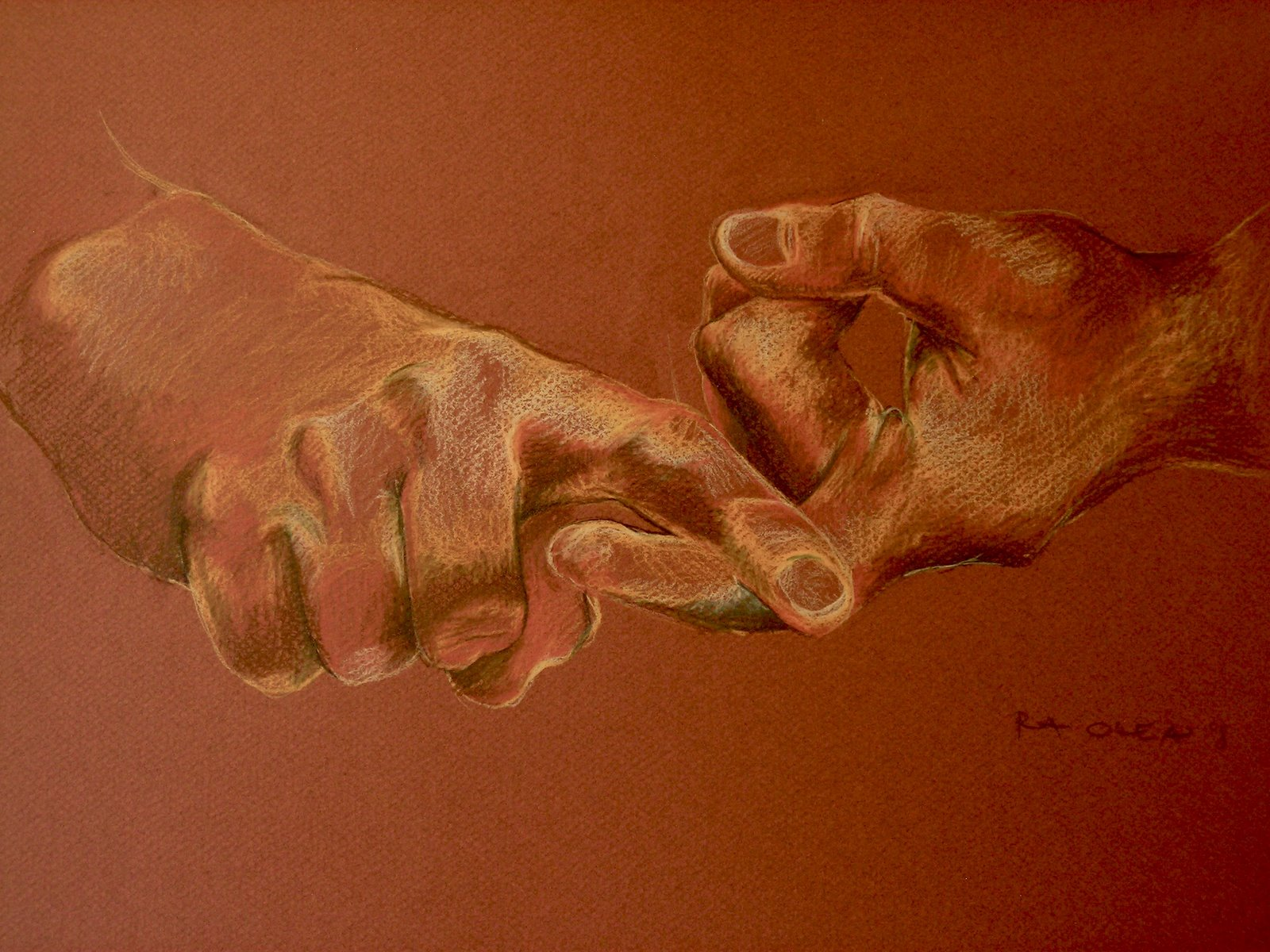
The sign for "friend" in American Sign Language

People with extreme hearing loss may communicate through sign languages. Sign languages convey meaning through manual communication and body language instead of acoustically conveyed sound patterns. This involves the simultaneous combination of hand shapes, orientation, and movement of the hands, arms, or body, and facial expressions to express a speaker's thoughts. "Sign languages are based on the idea that vision is the most useful tool a deaf person has to communicate and receive information".

Deaf culture refers to a tight-knit cultural group of people whose primary language is signed, and who practice social and cultural norms which are distinct from those of the surrounding hearing community. This community does not automatically include all those who are clinically or legally deaf, nor does it exclude every hearing person. According to Baker and Padden, it includes any person or persons who "identifies him/herself as a member of the Deaf community, and other members accept that person as a part of the community," an example being children of deaf adults with normal hearing ability. It includes the set of social beliefs, behaviors, art, literary traditions, history, values, and shared institutions of communities that are influenced by deafness and which use sign languages as the main means of communication. Members of the Deaf community tend to view deafness as a difference in human experience rather than a disability or disease. When used as a cultural label especially within the culture, the word deaf is often written with a capital D and referred to as "big D Deaf" in speech and sign. When used as a label for the audiological condition, it is written with a lower case d.

Multiple educational institutions for both deaf and Deaf people usually use sign language as the main language of instruction. Famous institutions include Gallaudet University and the National Technical Institute for the Deaf in the US, and the National University Corporation of Tsukuba University of Technology in Japan.

=== Access and affordability ===
Access to hearing aids and hearing care varies widely by country, with affordability often cited as a major barrier to treatment. In New Zealand, public funding schemes provide partial or full subsidies for hearing aids depending on eligibility criteria, such as age, severity of hearing loss, and financial need.

To further improve access, some providers in New Zealand, such as Resonate Health, have introduced subscription-based hearing aid models. These typically bundle device costs, servicing, and follow-up care into a monthly fee, reducing the upfront cost of treatment.

As of 2013, hearing loss affects about 1.1 billion people to some degree. It causes disability in about 466 million people (5% of the global population), and moderate to severe disability in 124 million people. Of those with moderate to severe disability 108 million live in low and middle-income countries. Of those with hearing loss, it began during childhood for 65 million. Those who use sign language and are members of Deaf culture may see themselves as having a difference rather than a disability. Many members of Deaf culture reject cochlear implants and some within this community view them with concern as they have the potential to eliminate their culture.

== Research ==
=== Stem cell transplant and gene therapy ===
A 2005 study achieved successful regrowth of cochlear cells in guinea pigs. However, the regrowth of cochlear hair cells does not imply the restoration of hearing sensitivity, as the sensory cells may or may not make connections with neurons that carry the signals from hair cells to the brain. A 2008 study has shown that gene therapy targeting Atoh1 can cause hair cell growth and attract neuronal processes in embryonic mice. Some hope that a similar treatment will one day ameliorate hearing loss in humans.

Recent research reported in 2012 achieved growth of cochlear nerve cells resulting in hearing improvements in gerbils by using stem cells. Also reported in 2013 was regrowth of hair cells in deaf adult mice using a drug intervention resulting in hearing improvement. The Hearing Health Foundation in the US has embarked on a project called the Hearing Restoration Project. Also Action on Hearing Loss in the UK is also aiming to restore hearing.

Researchers reported in 2015 that genetically deaf mice which were treated with TMC1 gene therapy recovered some of their hearing. In 2017, additional studies were performed to treat Usher syndrome and here, a recombinant adeno-associated virus seemed to outperform the older vectors.

=== Audition ===
Besides research studies seeking to improve hearing, such as those listed above, studies on the deaf have also been conducted to understand audition. Pijil and Schwarz (2005) conducted their study on the deaf who lost their hearing later in life and, hence, used cochlear implants to hear. They discovered further evidence for rate coding of pitch, a system that codes for information about frequencies by the rate at which neurons fire in the auditory system, especially for lower frequencies, as they are coded by the frequencies that neurons fire from the basilar membrane synchronously. Their results showed that the subjects could identify different pitches that were proportional to the frequency stimulated by a single electrode. The lower frequencies were detected when the basilar membrane was stimulated, providing even further evidence for rate coding.

== See also ==
- Audiology
- Deaf hearing
- H.870
- Safe listening
- World Hearing Day
