= Sensear =

Sensear is an Australian company located in Perth, Western Australia which manufactures and distributes hearing protection and communication equipment globally. Their products are designed to protect hearing while facilitating normal communication.

== Technology ==
The Sensear earmuffs and earplugs allow people to talk face-to-face and use the mobile phone and/or two-way radio communication in high noise (above 95 dB(A)) environments while providing hearing protection. Sensear uses a patented software system called SENS (Speech Enhancement Noise Suppression) Technology that identifies human voices and actively suppresses background noise. Each Sensear unit uses a series of directional microphones that process sound from all directions. A complex frequency algorithm determines which direction the speech is coming from. Where speech is detected, ambient noise from other directions is suppressed while the speaker's voice is enhanced. The processed sound is delivered in stereo to the wearer. This audio allows users to have face-to-face conversations in high-noise environments up to 95 dB without removing their hearing protection. It also provides 360-degree situational awareness (Directional - 3D sound) that allows the wearer to determine which direction the voice or other audio (Noise) is coming from. Models are available with different communication options including a two-way radio connection via cable and/or a Bluetooth capability so users can talk on the phone and/or two-way radio wirelessly without removing their hearing protection. Some models also have built-in short-range radios for headset-to-headset communication. Headset and earplug versions are available with varying intrinsically safe certifications including (ATEX, IECEx, UL, CSA, and TIA) for hearing protection and communication in high noise and hazardous environments.

== Worldwide distribution ==
The company has established distribution and marketing bases in Europe and the US. They supply to customers in the oil and gas, petrochemical, mining, energy, manufacturing, construction, transportation, military, law enforcement and entertainment industry. Customers include Alcoa, Boeing, Qantas, Arrium and BHP.

== Awards ==
Sensear has won several industry awards including an Australian Design Award, the DuPont Innovation Award and two iAwards from the Australian Information Industry Association.

== See also ==
- Earplug § Electronic earplugs (active earplugs in general)
