= Hearing protection fit-testing =

Test for determining the effectiveness hearing protection devices

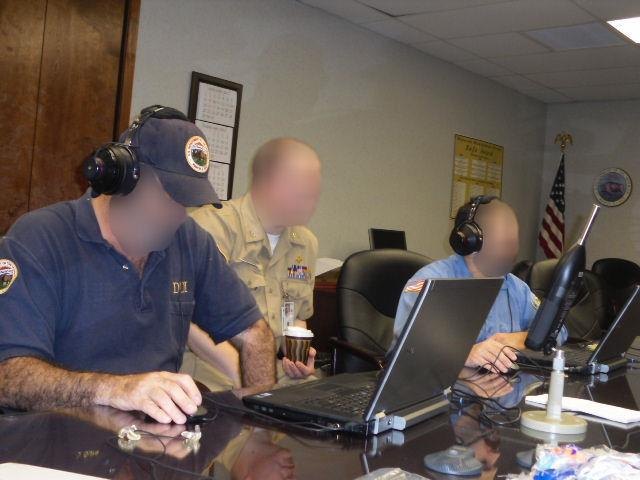
Hearing protector fit-testing

Hearing protector fit-testing is a method that measures the degree of noise reduction obtained from an individual wearing a particular hearing protection device (HPD) - for example, a noise canceling earplug or earmuff. Fit testing is necessary because noise attenuation varies across individuals. Attenuation can sometimes score as zero due to anatomical differences and inadequate training, as to the proper wear and use. Labeled HPD attenuation values (for example, the Noise Reduction Rating, or NRR) are average values that cannot predict noise attenuation for an individual; in addition, they are based on laboratory measurements which may overestimate the noise reduction obtained in the real world.

Hearing protection devices such as earplugs or earmuffs must be worn correctly for the wearer to be protected from noise. Correct use of hearing protection includes:

- Choosing the most appropriate hearing protection device, both with appropriate level of attenuation and appropriate fit for the individual. Ideally, the device should limit the sound intensity that reaches the ear to levels below 85 dBA. If the attenuation does not limit the noise levels to that level, other alternatives should be sought. If the attenuation is greater than that, it can also interfere with the HPD use by making it difficult to hear important sounds.
- Wearing or inserting the hearing protection device correctly so it seals the wearer's ear canal, using the "roll-pull-hold" method for foam earplugs, and ensuring earmuffs create an unbroken seal around each ear.

Fit-testing hearing protection can facilitate an appropriate choice of hearing protection, and allow for the professional administering the fit-test to train users on proper techniques for wear.

== Requirements and recommendations for HPD fit testing ==
Countries that have published standards recommending the use of fit testing as part of hearing conservation interventions include Argentina, Australia, Brazil, Italy, Russia, Uruguay, and Venezuela. A few other countries (Canada, Germany, Malaysia) and the US Department of Defense are regulating its use as part of hearing conservation interventions. Effective March 31, 2023, the Alberta Government added a requirement that employers fit test each employee who wears HPDs. A trend towards recommending HPD fit-testing as a best practice is emerging in the European Union and the USA.

In January 2025 NIOSH published a Science Policy Update recommending employers use individual, quantitative fit testing to evaluate the attenuation received by workers from their hearing protection devices. The Occupational Safety and Health Administration, National Hearing Conservation Association, and National Institute for Occupational Safety and Health (NIOSH) recommend it for all workers used HPD as a best practice, and describes existing testing methods and how to incorporate them in hearing conservation programs.

== Fit-testing methods ==
Fit testing is typically carried out using one of the available fit-testing hardware and software systems (also known as field attenuation estimation system (FAES). Although all fit-testing systems measure the amount of sound reduction provided by hearing protection devices, different systems use different approaches to making this measurement.

The different methods used to measure the attenuation provided by HPDs are as follows:

=== Real-ear attenuation at threshold (REAT) ===
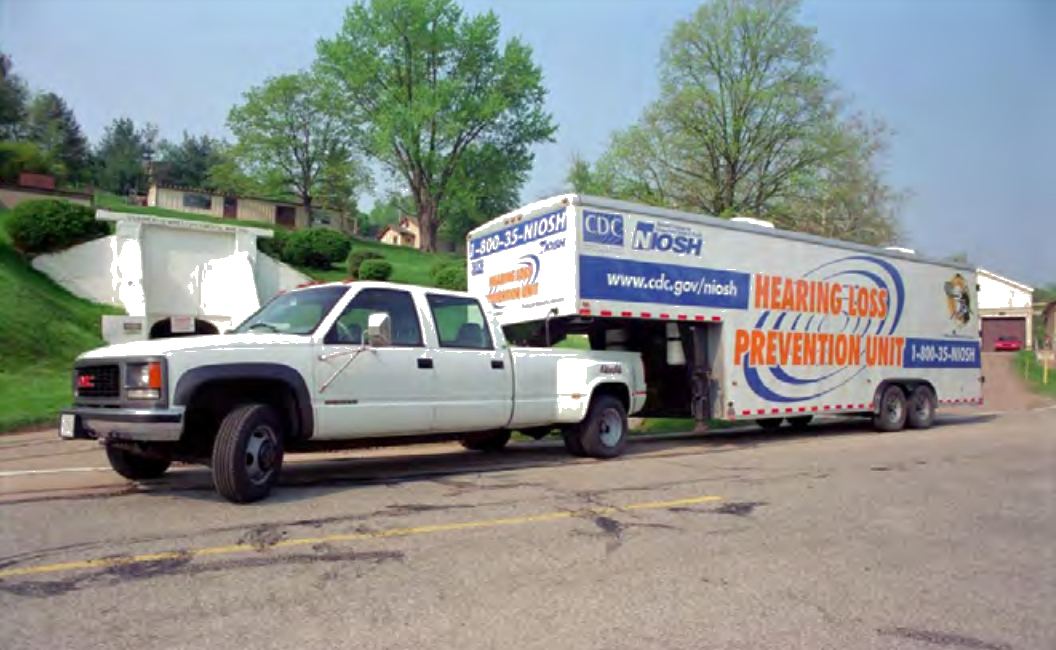
NIOSH mobile laboratory for REAT measuring (sound thresholds & real attenuation of earplugs)

REAT is the most commonly used type of fit-testing technology used in commercial systems. REAT systems are modeled on the "gold-standard" approach to measuring hearing protector attenuation as defined in acoustic standards such as ANSI/ASA S12.6 and the ISO 4869–1. This approach measures the difference in auditory (hearing) thresholds without hearing protection (unoccluded) and with hearing protection (occluded). Differences in occluded and unoccluded thresholds across one or more test frequencies are used to calculate the noise reduction. REAT systems rely on the subjective response of the person being tested to determine auditory thresholds much like a hearing test where the subject indicates when sound is heard at various frequencies.

According to the acoustic standards, REAT testing of hearing protection devices must be tested in an acoustic chamber with a diffuse sound field. Because such chambers are not mobile, portable fit-testing systems employing sound-isolating headphones have been developed to test earplugs. For noncritical screening, REAT can be performed using a web browser and simple audio devices.

=== Loudness balance ===
This method first has the subject listen to tones with headphones and "match" loudness between both ears until tones sound equally loud on both sides. Then an earplug is placed in one ear while the baseline procedure is repeated to match loudness in both ears. The increase in loudness required to balance represents the attenuation achieved in that ear. The second earplug is then placed in the other ear and the procedure is repeated a third time. The required increase in loudness this time represents the noise reduction achieved in the second ear. The loudness balance fit-testing approach provides individual personal attenuation ratings for each ear.

=== Microphone-in-real-ear (MIRE) ===
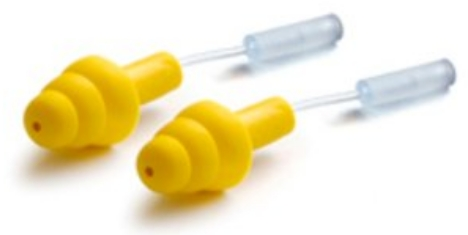
Earplugs with probes for MIRE measurements.

Also referred to as F-MIRE (field microphone in real ear). This method measures attenuation by placing a small microphone inside the ear canal while hearing protection is worn. Sound pressure levels (SPL) are measured inside and outside of the ear simultaneously and used to calculate a PAR.

== Fit test results ==
The effectiveness is typically measured as a personal attenuation rating (PAR) which is subtracted from the known noise exposure to estimate the total noise exposure a single person has when wearing the tested hearing protection device (HPD).

The outcome measure generated by hearing protector fit-test systems varies from a simple pass/fail to a quantitative personal attenuation rating (PAR). and can be interpreted differently to determine the effectiveness of hearing protection or calculate total noise exposure.

=== Personal attenuation rating (PAR) ===
Similar to a noise reduction rating (NRR) required on hearing protection devices in the United States, a personal attenuation rating (PAR) is obtained from an attenuation measurement at one or more than one frequency. The effectiveness is typically measured as a personal attenuation rating (PAR) which is subtracted from the known noise exposure to estimate the total noise exposure a single person has when wearing the tested hearing protection device (HPD). However, the PAR is regarded as more accurate than the NRR because it is calculated per individual and per hearing protection device, while NRR is a generalized estimate of potential sound reduction based on the protection provided to a small population of people. Therefore, PAR gives the evaluator an estimate of the total noise exposure an individual is receiving when wearing hearing protection.

PAR is subtracted from the known noise exposure to estimate the total protected noise exposure a single person has when wearing the tested HPD. The method for estimating protected noise exposure based on the measured PAR may vary slightly across fit-test systems, so it is important to understand to use the PAR generated by a given fit test system

== Use of fit-testing as a training tool ==
Evidence shows that including fit-testing as a part of employee training for correct hearing protection device use increases the user's ability to properly fit the device, and that this ability is often retained on follow-up. Fit testing provides the individual with immediate feedback regarding the noise reduction achieved, which helps them understand how the device should feel when it is properly fit. Investments in fit testing and training have been shown to be effective at reducing the rates of standard threshold shifts in industry.

A systematic review published in 2024 investigated the effectiveness of hearing protection fit-testing systems and as well as any training occurring alongside the use of these systems in improving the amount of attenuation from noise these workers received. This review included three different studies, which together totaled evaluations on 756 participants. The studies evaluated the impacts of either simple or extensive instructions provided to workers for inserting and fitting earplugs (foam or pre-molded). Extensive training included personalized instruction, while simple training lacked this one-on-instruction. Fit testing with extensive instructions was found to enhance workers' protection against noise following the test and training sessions, while training with only simple instructions did not significantly improve personal attenuation ratings over the absence of instructions. Thus, fit testing system effectiveness may vary depending on the type of training methods employed in addition to the type of HPD used during fit testing.

== See also ==
- Noise health effects
- Noise-induced hearing loss
- Hearing conservation programs
- Hearing protection device
- Earplug
- Earmuffs
- Safe-in-Sound Award
- Safe listening
