= Earmuffs =

Ear-protecting headgear worn over ears to protect from cold or loud noise

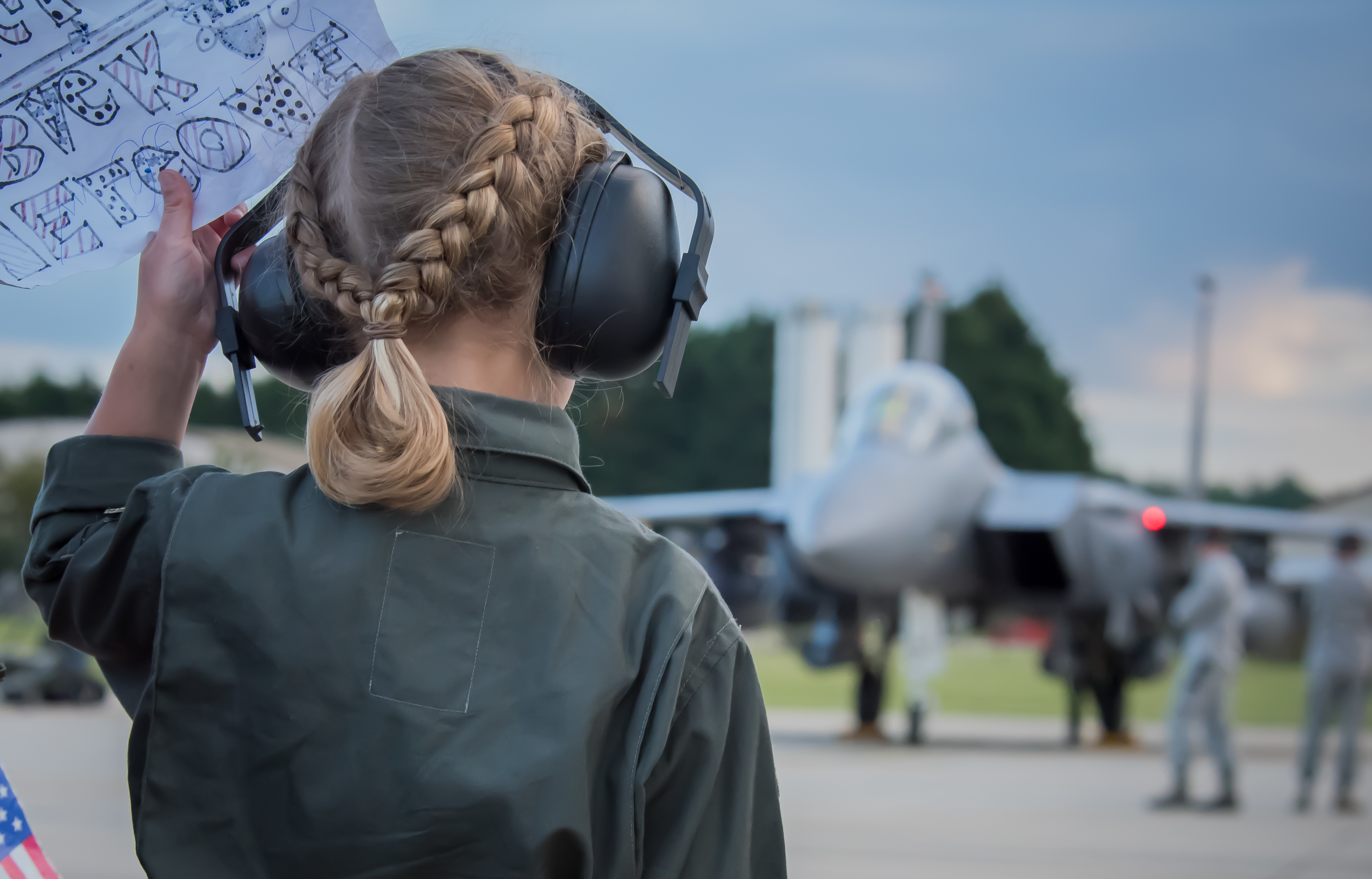
A person wearing earmuffs that provide hearing protection

Earmuffs are accessories designed to cover a person's ears either for warmth or for hearing protection. Both types of earmuff consist of a thermoplastic or metal head-band that fits over the top or back of the head, and a cushion or cup at each end to usually cover both ears. Hearing protection earmuffs are a type of personal protective equipment.

== Cold weather ==
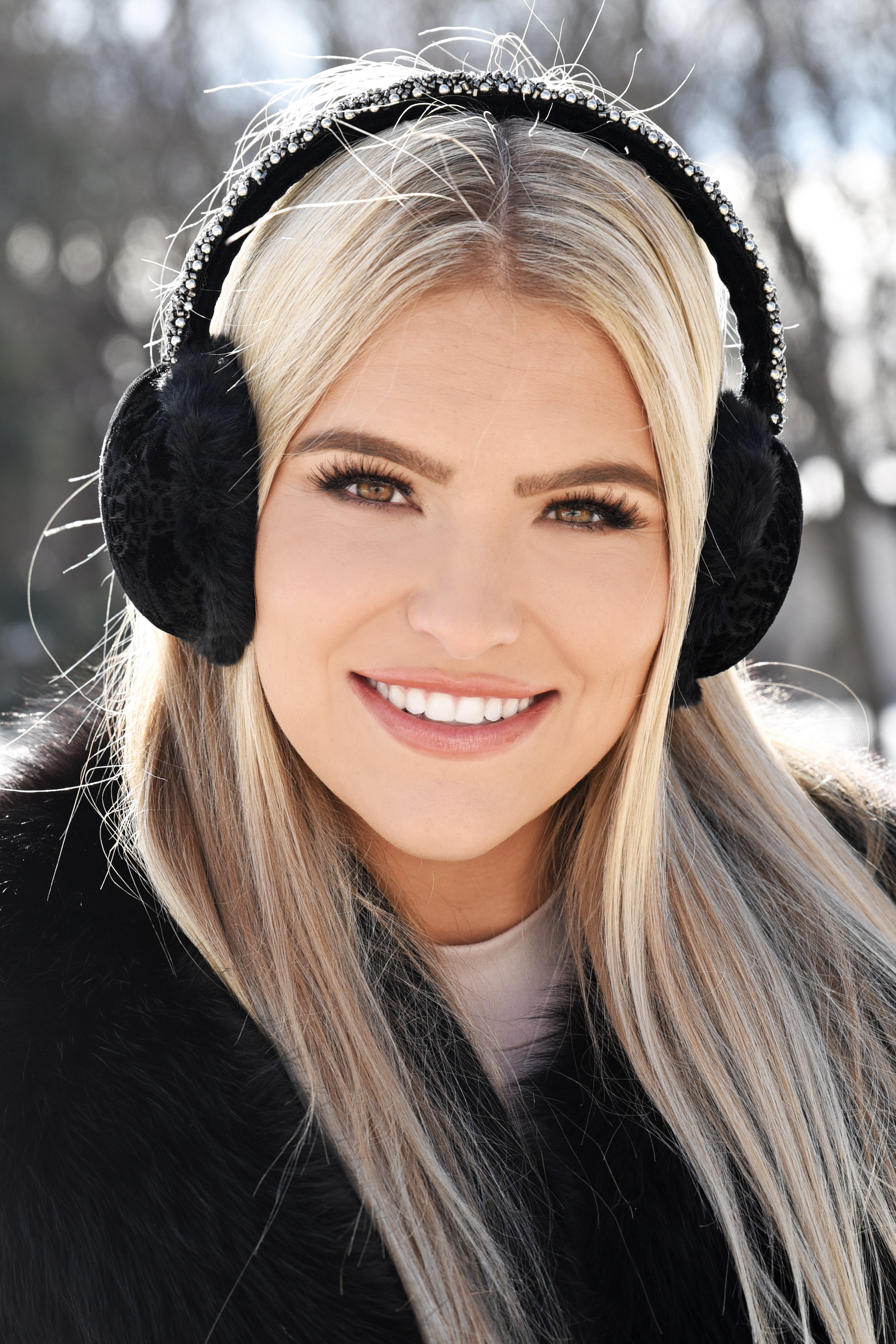
Woman wearing cold-weather thermal earmuffs

=== History ===
Thermal earmuffs were invented by Chester Greenwood of Farmington, Maine in 1873, when he was 15. He reportedly conceived the idea while ice skating, and asked his grandmother to sew tufts of fur between loops of wire. His patent was for improved ear protectors, which he and his local employees manufactured in the Farmington area for nearly 60 years.

=== Earmuffs vs. hats ===
Two people wearing behind-the-neck earmuffs

Thermal earmuffs are worn for protection from the cold. Because the ears extend from the sides of the head to gather sound waves, they have a high skin surface-area-to-volume ratio, and very little muscle tissue, causing them to be one of the first body parts to become uncomfortably cold as temperatures drop. Some people experience this discomfort even if most of the body is comfortably warm, especially during strenuous activity. Wind can often cause the ears to be much colder than the rest of the head. When the ears are uncomfortably cold and the rest of the body is much warmer, using a winter hat or the hood of a jacket to cover the ears may cause the head or body to be uncomfortably hot, possibly inducing perspiration of the head, a dangerous condition in cold weather. Earmuffs can be used to warm the ears only, avoiding overheating other parts of the body or trapping exhaust heat from strenuous movement.

=== Types of thermal earmuffs ===
There are two main types of thermal earmuffs. One type has a structure similar to large headphones, with a band going over the top of the head. Another type has two round earpieces made from a material that can produce heat, connected to a thick headband going around and behind the head. Earplugs are usually filled with a thermally insulating material, such as foam or fiber, to increase their heat retention capacity. Earplugs are also used as a fashion accessory and are made in different styles. Some headbands are thick and wide enough to warm the ears, and are referred to "earmuffs" when used this way.

== Hearing protection ==
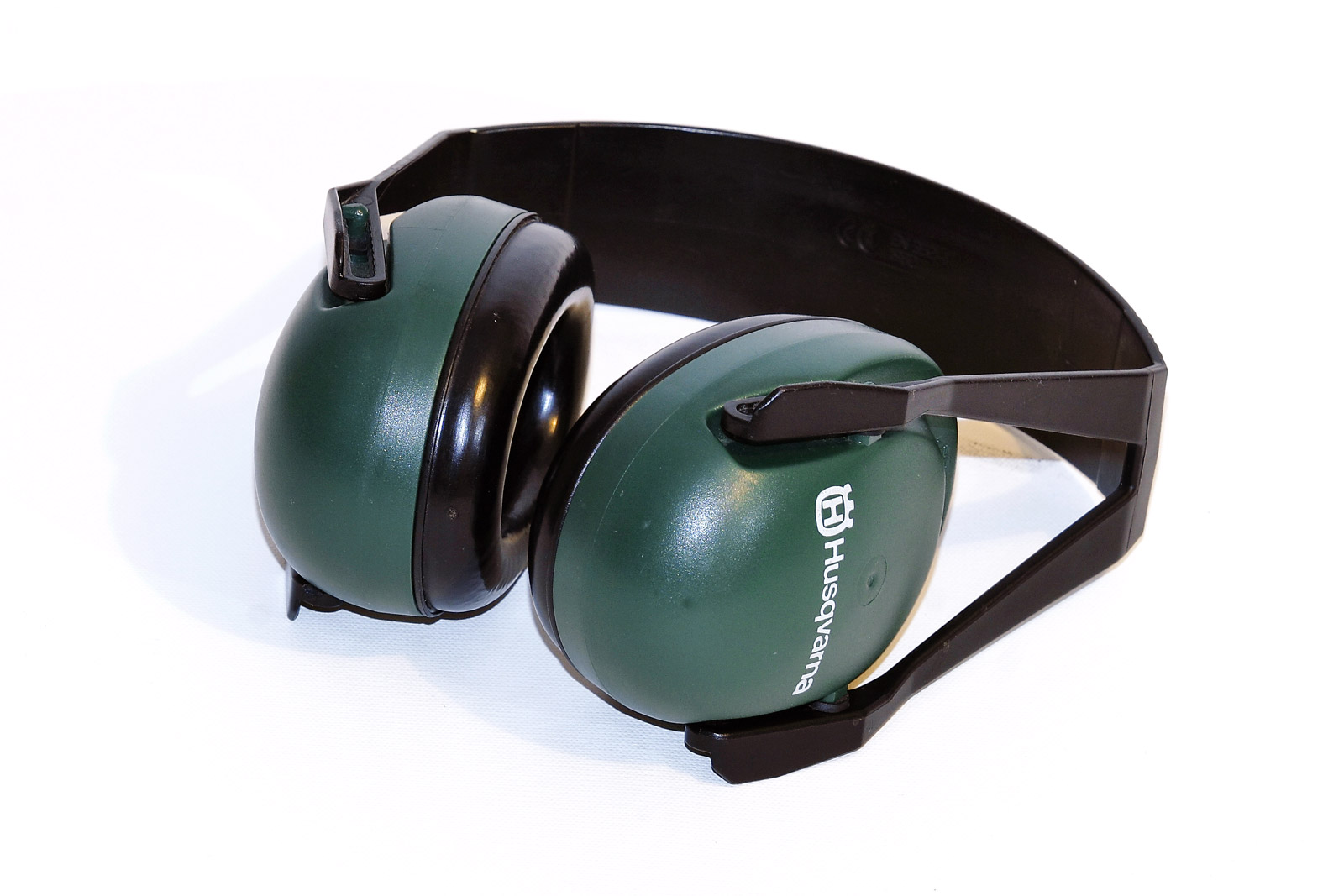
A pair of Husqvarna acoustic earmuffs.

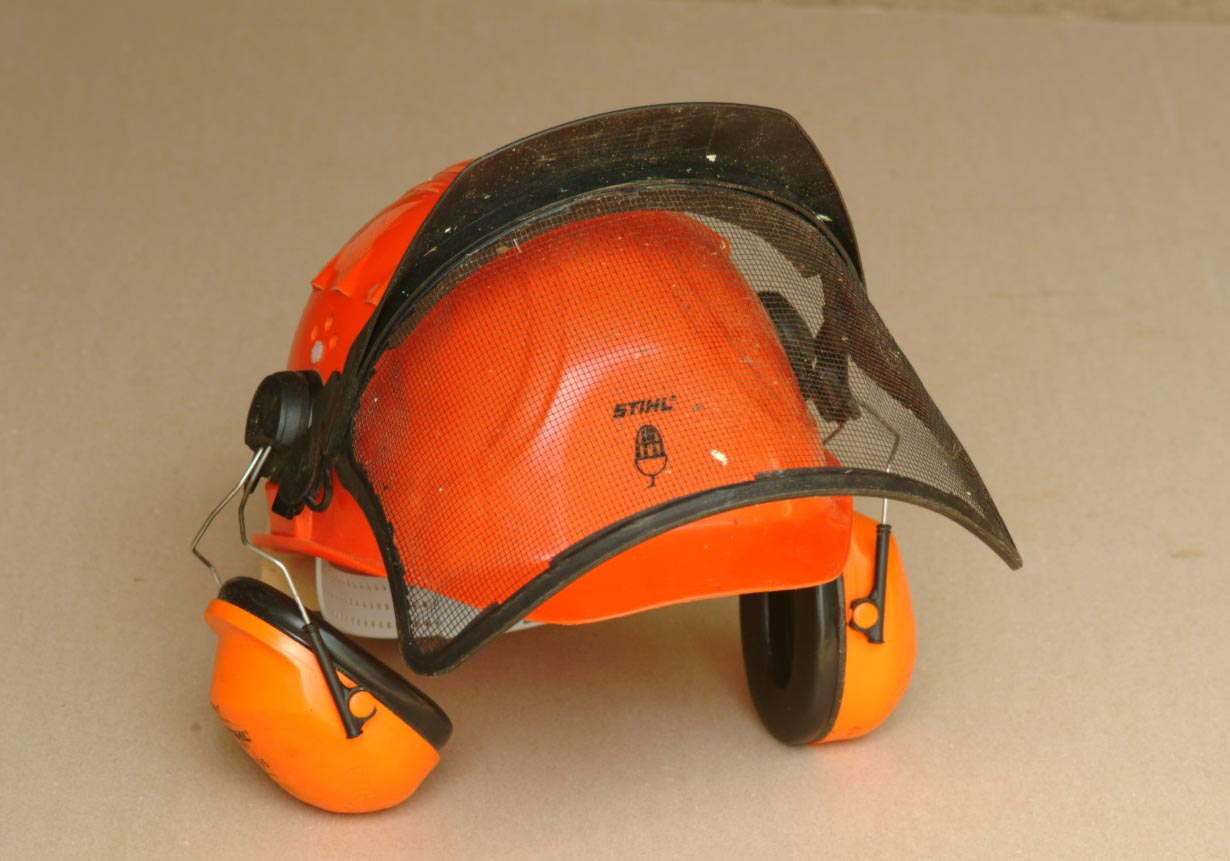
A hard hat with attached face shield and ear defenders.

=== History ===
Acoustic earmuffs, also known as ear defenders, are believed to have originated during World War II. Pilots of military aircraft wore leather flaps over their ears, supposedly to protect against noise-induced hearing loss due to engine noise. Prototype versions of earmuffs, composed of a headband and cuffs to fit over the outer ear, were soon after developed. These early versions were not practical due to the discomfort caused by the headbands being tightly fixed against the head. In 1954, an earmuff with a more comfortable cushion design was developed.

=== Overview ===
Hearing protection in the workplace in the United States is regulated by organizations such as the Occupational Safety and Health Administration (OSHA), the Mine Safety and Health Administration (MSHA), and the National Institute for Occupational Safety and Health (NIOSH). Hearing protection can be included in hearing conservation programs if noise exceeds a certain criteria. OSHA recommends the use of hearing protection devices (HPD) when an employer is exposed to an average noise intensity of 85 dBA over an 8-hour shift. HPD is required when exposed to average noise intensity of 90 dBA or greater over an 8-hour shift. MSHA requirements are similar to OSHA. OSHA and MSHA require the use of hearing protection for workers who have not had a baseline hearing test or have had a shift in hearing thresholds, called a standard threshold shift. But this does not mean that OSHA considers HPDs to be effective.

Hearing protection earmuffs have cups lined with sound-deadening material, like thermal earmuffs and headphones in appearance, which are worn as hearing protection. These may be carried on a head-band or clipped onto the sides of a hard hat, for use on construction sites. Some manufacturers combine headphones with ear defenders, allowing the wearer to listen to music, communication, or other audio source and also enjoy protection or isolation from ambient noise. For extra sound attenuation, earplugs can also be used in conjunction with earmuffs. The head-band and outer covering is usually made from a hard thermoplastic or metal. The protection usually comes from acoustic foam – this absorbs sound waves by increasing air resistance, thus reducing the amplitude of the waves. The energy is transformed into heat. Earmuffs can be used in the workplace or recreationally for loud activities, e.g., concerts, shooting firearms, heavy machinery, mowing, etc.

When persons are exposed to excessively loud environments (85 dB or more), hearing protection devices are recommended to prevent noise-induced hearing loss. Hearing protection should be worn whenever power tools, loud yard equipment, or firearms are used. Any noise greater than 140 dB can cause permanent hearing loss. Firearms range from a noise level of 140 dB to 175 dB depending on the firearm type. It is recommended to use dual hearing protection (earmuffs and earplugs together) when using firearms. Exposure to loud noises damages the hair cells in the inner ear that are essential for sending neural impulses to the brain in order to perceive sounds. Loss of these hair cells leads to hearing loss that may cause speech and sounds to be muffled or distorted. Tinnitus is often associated with hearing loss; there is no cure for tinnitus. In the workplace, OSHA requires the use of hearing protection devices whenever a person is exposed to an average noise intensity of 90 dBA or greater over an 8-hour shift. The louder the environment, the less time that a person may spend there without the risk of incurring hearing loss. NIOSH has also developed standards for hearing protection. Compared to OSHA, the NIOSH standards are more conservative in their estimates for safe noise exposure times. Tabulated below are the NIOSH standards for the maximum daily exposure times at various noise levels.

Level of noise (dB A)	Maximum daily exposure time
85	8 hours
91	2 hours
97	30 minutes
103	7 minutes

Because the auditory system has varying sensitivity to sound as a function of frequency, unprotected noise exposures to mid- to high- frequency sounds pose greater risk to hearing than low frequency sounds. This frequency dependence is reflected in the use of the A-weighting curve to describe the decibel level of an exposure (dB A). The A-weighting curve weights the mid frequency content, 500 to 4000 Hz, more than the frequencies outside that range. At lower, non-damaging sound levels, hearing protection will reduce fatigue from frequent exposure to sound.

=== Attenuation characteristics ===
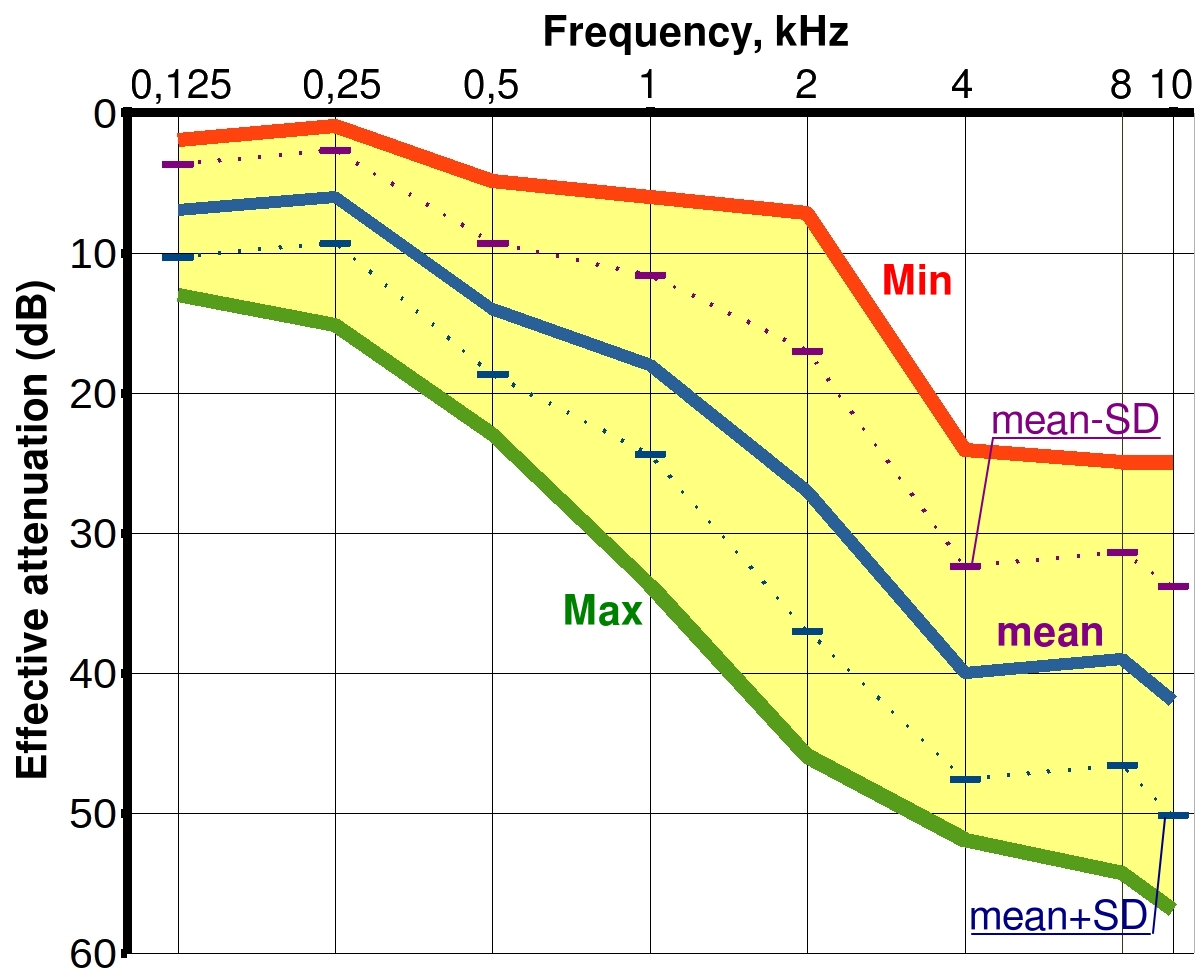
The variability in the effectiveness of the earmuffs when used by 8 participants (REAT method)

A typical earmuff attenuates (decreases) the level of noise by approximately 23 dB when tested under carefully controlled laboratory conditions. The EPA requires that earmuff manufacturers test each device's performance and indicate their specific noise-reduction capabilities on the product labeling. This single number is called the Noise Reduction Rating, or NRR. The attenuation is higher when measured in laboratory testing than worn in the field, or in real world settings. However, earmuffs had the least variability compared to earplugs. Discrepancies between the field and lab results could be due to improper training of how to wear the device. Experiments have indicated that the actual attenuation achieved by ordinary users of earmuffs is only 33% to 74% of the labeled NRR. Improper fit, device deterioration, and a poor seal with the head all contribute to reduced device performance. Despite these drawbacks, research has shown that the real-world performance of earmuffs is in closer agreement to manufacturers' labels than it is for earplugs. This suggests that earmuffs are more intuitive for users to wear correctly and in some cases may be a more appropriate choice of hearing protection.

When deciding between earmuffs and earplugs, it is also important to consider the noise reduction levels achieved at different sound frequencies. In general, earmuffs provide less attenuation for low-frequency (<500 Hz) sounds than earplugs. Thus, in situations where noise is dominated by low-frequency energy, earplugs are likely to be more effective. Earmuffs also fail to provide any noise reduction at infrasonic frequencies (< 20 Hz), which is energy that cannot be heard because it falls below the range of human hearing sensitivity. In contrast, earplugs can provide some attenuation to infrasonic sounds.

=== Passive vs. active ===
There are two different types of earmuffs used to protect the user from loud sounds based on the acoustical properties and materials used to create them: passively attenuating and actively attenuating earmuffs.

The ability of a passive earmuff to attenuate a signal is based on the materials used. The material and structure of the earmuff device is used to decrease the sound level that is transmitted through the ear canal. Materials, such as a cupped foam coated in hard plastic, will block sound due to the thick and dampening properties of the foam.

Active earmuffs have an electronic component and microphones that allow the user to control their access to communication while attenuating background noise. When in loud, hazardous settings, the wearer may still be required to listen to outside sources, such as machinery work, their supervisor's commands, or talk to their colleagues. While the material and design of the muff allows for a reasonable attenuation (roughly 22 dBNRR), the user has the option to allow some sounds in that are necessary for their job. These earmuffs incorporate a volume control to increase and decrease the attenuation.

Active noise reduction earmuffs incorporate electronic noise cancellation or active noise cancellation to attenuate (roughly 26 dB NRR) low frequency noise. A microphone, circuit, and speaker inside the muff are used to actively cancel out noise. As a signal enters the microphone, the electronics within the earmuff cast a signal back that is 180° out of phase with the signal, thus "cancelling" this signal. This opposing signal reduces the amplitude of the waveform and reduces the signal. These earmuffs are designed to protect against a continuous signal, particularly low frequency sounds, such as diesel locomotives, heavy tractors, or airfields.

=== Dual protection with earplugs ===
Most earmuffs can be expected to provide adequate attenuation for noise levels up to 103 dBC. At levels beyond this intensity, it becomes necessary for users to wear earplugs with earmuffs on top in order to achieve adequate protection from hearing damage. The simultaneous use of two forms of hearing protections is known as dual hearing protection. The MSHA regulations stipulate that workers must use dual hearing protection when average 8-hour exposures are 105 dBA or greater. The US Department of Defense recommends use of dual protection when exposed to noise ranging from 108-118 dBA. Dual protection is also recommended when shooting firearms because of the extremely high-level impulses (140 dB and greater) produced.

The amount of noise reduction from dual hearing protection is not a sum of the noise reductions ratings from the two devices. For example, if wearing an earplug with a NRR of 25 dB and an earmuff with an NRR of 20 dB, the combined protection would not be 45 dB. Instead, 5 dB should be added to the higher of the two NRRs. In the preceding example, the combined earmuff and earplug NRR would be estimated at 30 dB (25 dB plus 5).

=== Barriers to effectiveness ===
==== Fit ====
A proper fit of the earmuffs on the head is essential to providing adequate hearing protection. Individuals will require earmuffs of differing sizes. This is especially important to remember when considering earmuffs for children. Muffs should make a good seal against the head and should fully cover the outer ear without pushing against the ears. Additionally, the headband should be the correct length to hold the cushions over the ears. Otherwise, sound can leak under the muffs and will reach the users' ears. Some wearers may use their earmuffs when hair is covering their ears or while wearing glasses. Prior to placement on the head, hair should be carefully pulled back and away from the cushions. Placing earmuffs over obstructing hair or safety glasses with thick frames may reduce the earmuff attenuation by 5-10 dB. Even eyeglasses with thinner frames can reduce the effectiveness of hearing protection by 3-7 dB.

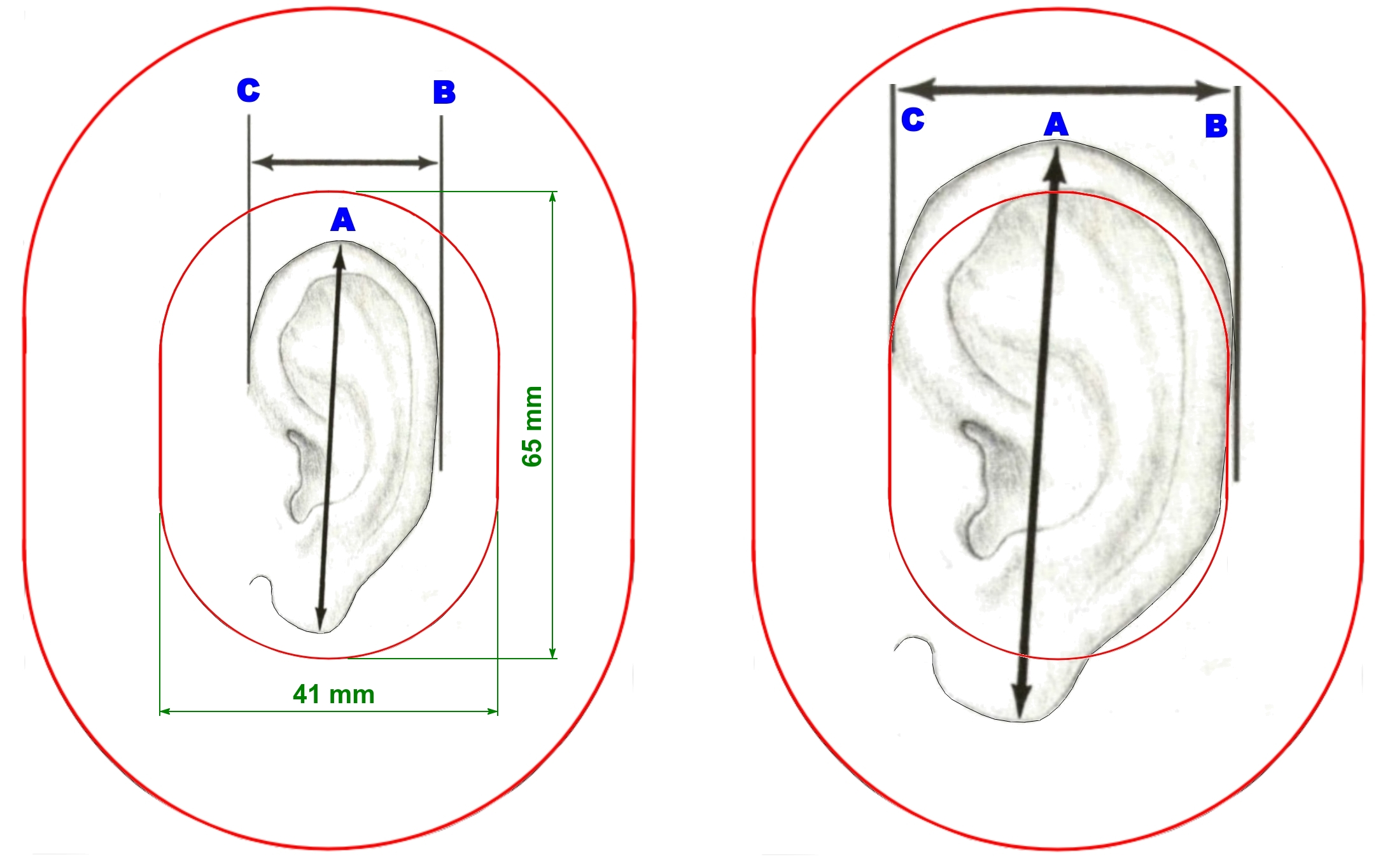
The size of the "standard" cup is 65×41 mm. During an anthropometric study, the ear sizes of 2436 pilots were obtained, the maximum dimensions: 79.7 and 53.8 mm (right image).

One simple method for checking earmuff fit is to lift one or both muffs away from the head while in a noisy environment. If the noise is considerably louder with the adjustment, then the earmuffs are providing at least some degree of noise reduction.

Improper earmuff fit can cause discomfort, which in turn may cause the individual to avoid wearing the hearing protection device, reducing its effectiveness. Characteristics of a comfortable earmuff include: lightweight material, soft and removable circumaural cushions, low heat and humidity buildup, easy maintenance, reduction in low-frequency noise, no resonances of sound within the earcup, wide headband, and large enough earcups to allow for full coverage of the outer ear. If the individual finds the hearing protection device to be uncomfortable, he or she should explore other options for hearing protection, such as a different style of earmuff or earplugs.

Styles

There are different earmuff style options for HPD users. Styles include: cap-mounts for hard hats, neckbands for use with welding helmets and faceshields, folding earmuffs are meant to be portable and easy to store, and multi-position earmuffs worn in varies positions are useful for versatility to wear both earmuffs and other safety ware, such as glasses or masks.

Structural transmission

It is possible for sound to transmit through the earmuff materials, reducing the device's effectiveness. This transmission is primarily seen above 1000 Hz.

Vibration of the earmuff

Exposure to high level noise (190 dB SPL) may cause the earmuff to vibrate off the external ear causing a leak which would allow hazardous exposure to dangerous levels of noise. In loud enough environments, the ear canal can vibrate, causing the air trapped inside the earcup to vibrate as well. This typically only occurs with low frequency noise, but can reduce the effectiveness of the hearing protection device. Technology in earmuffs is developing and shows promise in reducing the effects of airflow vibrations in the ear muffs.

Readjustment

During the amount of time an individual wears earmuffs, the device can be jostled and displaced from the proper position that allows for the highest attenuation. This can be common in the workplace, as many individuals are in motion during the time they are wearing the hearing protection device. Moving the jaw while chewing or talking and perspiration are examples of ways in which readjustment can occur, causing the seal to be broken between the earcup and skin and allowing sound to leak in.

==== Deterioration ====
It is also important to consider the age and physical condition of earmuffs. Earmuffs should be inspected regularly for cracks and changes in shape or firmness. Headbands may also lose their tension or ability to properly adjust to the head, which could lead to a decrease in device effectiveness. Physical changes could create an opening to the ear, allowing sound through and reducing attenuation. According to some manufacturers, ear cushions should be replaced every 6-8 months if used regularly. If earmuffs are used very frequently then the cushion should be replaced every 3-4 months.

Detriments

Wearing earmuffs makes it difficult to communicate because it blocks speech noise which may make speech sound muffled or unintelligible. It also makes it difficult to localize sound.

=== Specific considerations for hearing protection for workers with hearing loss ===
Workers with hearing loss face additional risk factors on the job site such as an inability to hear warning signals or alarms, an increased difficulty to tell where sounds are coming from, and increased difficulty communicating with co-workers. This occurs due to the hearing protection device (HPD) attenuating the signals/noises below the level that the worker is able to hear. OSHA regulations require individuals to wear HPD regardless of their amount of hearing loss, even if they have a severe to profound hearing loss. Workers that have sustained a standard threshold shift are required by OSHA to wear HPD at an 85 dB TWA. There are special considerations to take into account when fitting HPD on workers with a hearing loss. These factors include comfort, degree and configuration of the worker's hearing loss, the necessary communication demands in the workplace (verbal vs. nonverbal), the ease of communication, and the noise exposure levels of the worker.

Workers may want to wear their hearing aids under an earmuff. According to OSHA, hearing aids should not be used in areas with dangerous noise levels. However, OSHA allows for the professional(s) in charge of the hearing loss protection program to decide on a case-by-case basis if a worker can wear their hearing aids under an earmuff in high-level noise environments. Workers are not permitted to wear their hearing aids (even if they are turned off) instead of using HPD. OSHA specifies that hearing aids are not "hearing protectors" and do not attenuate enough sound to be used instead of HPD. Wearing hearing aids alone, without the use of earmuffs, could potentially cause additional noise-induced hearing loss. It is recommended that workers should not use their hearing aids without the use of an earmuff when exposed to sound levels over 80 dBA.

Devices that provide both communication enhancement and hearing protection can be used to attenuate loud sounds and amplify soft-level sounds. These are available with both wireless and wired options. The effects of these will vary based on the degree and configuration of the worker's hearing loss. Dual hearing protection with electronic/communication elements may aid a person with hearing loss in hearing warning signals and help with communication. Workers with a high frequency hearing loss may benefit more from HPD that attenuates sounds equally across the pitch range. This is helpful because traditional HPD will attenuate the higher frequencies (where these individuals have a hearing loss) more than the mid- and low-frequencies. Whereas, HPD that attenuate equally across the pitch range, can provide more comfort and balancing of loudness across the pitches for these individuals with hearing loss. This type of HPD are commonly referred to as "musicians plugs." NIOSH provides a "Hearing Protector Device Compendium" with information on the different types of HPD.

== See also ==
- Headphones
- Earplugs
- Muffs
- Noise-induced hearing loss
- Noise pollution
- Personal protective equipment
- Hearing protection fit testing
- Dielectric
- National Institute for Occupational Safety and Health
