= Hearing protection device =

Protection device for auditory organs

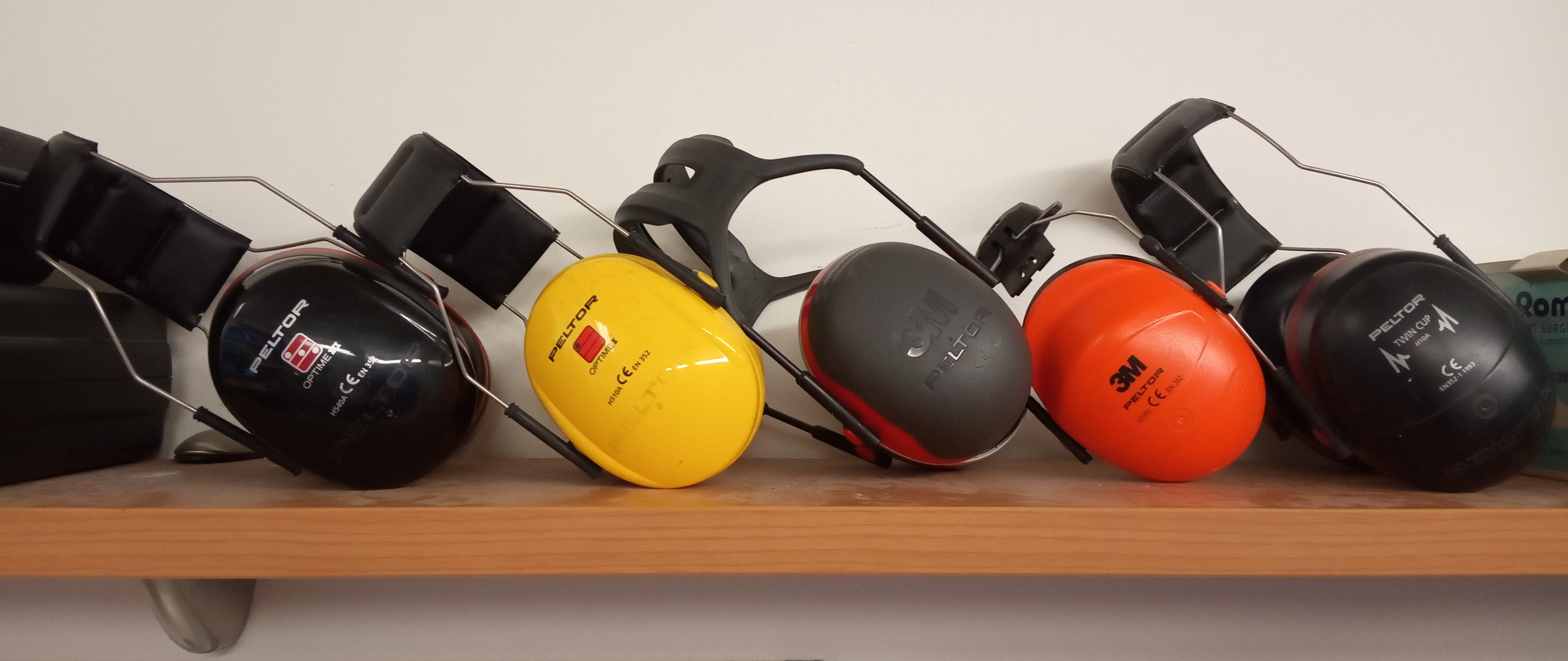
Various earmuff hearing protectors.

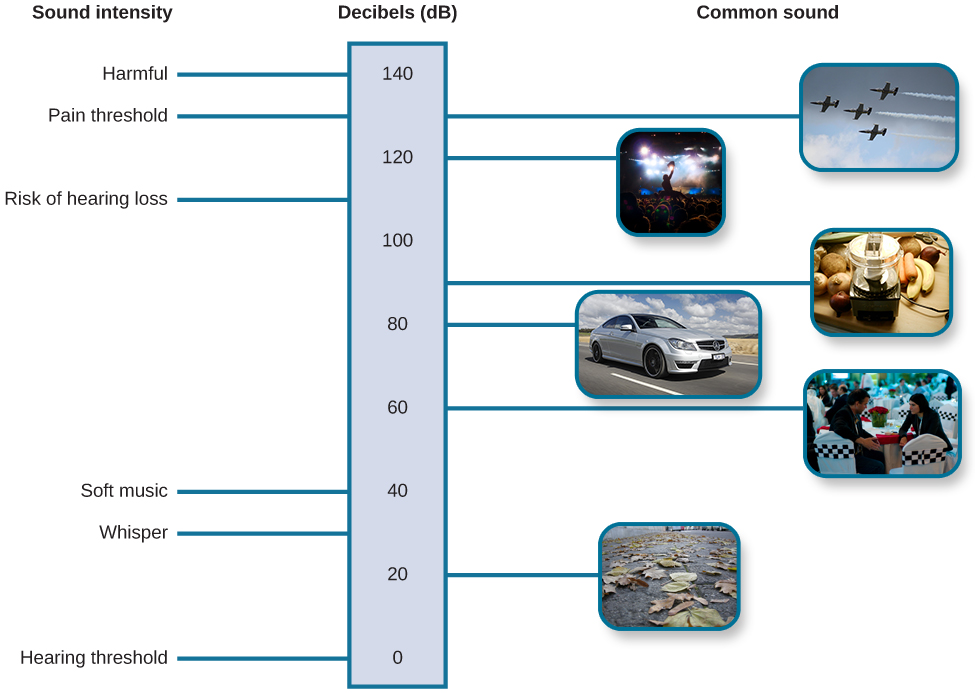
Sound levels of some daily activities

A hearing protection device, also known as an HPD, is an ear protection device worn in or over the ears while exposed to hazardous noise and provide hearing protection to help prevent noise-induced hearing loss. HPDs reduce the level of the noise entering the ear. HPDs can also protect against other effects of noise exposure such as tinnitus and hyperacusis. There are many different types of HPDs available for use, including earmuffs, earplugs, electronic hearing protection devices, and semi-insert devices.

The use of the HPD without individual selection, training and fit testing does not significantly reduce the risk of hearing loss. For example, one study covered more than 19 thousand workers, some of whom usually used hearing protective devices, and some did not use them at all. There was no statistically significant difference in the risk of noise-induced hearing loss.

Standards and regulations focused on preventing the effects of occupational noise vary across countries. Since companies can often operate in more than one country, health and safety professionals are expected to be informed of the different requirements and their implementation, we well as best practices and their effectiveness.

== Exposure limits ==
In the context of work, adequate hearing protection is that which reduces noise exposure to below 85 dBA over the course of an average work shift of eight hours.

When sounds exceed 80 dBA, it becomes dangerous to the ears. In the US, the National Institute for Occupational Safety and Health (NIOSH) has standards that show how long a person can be in different loudness levels before the person reaches their maximum daily dose and becomes damaging to their hearing. These standards can give individuals an idea of when hearing protection should be considered. The maximum daily dose with the corresponding decibel level is shown below.

- 8 hours at 85 dB(A)
- 2 hours at 91 dB(A)
- 15 minutes at 100 dB(A)

| Noise, dBA | Time reaching maximum daily dose, hours : minutes | | |
| Noise, dBA | OSHA, TWA 90 dB(A), exchange rate 5 dB | NIOSH, TWA 85 dB(A), exchange rate 3 dB | ISO 1999, TWA 80 dB(A), exchange rate 3 dB |
|---|---|---|---|
| 80 | – | – | 8 : 00 |
| 81 | – | 20 : 9.5 | 6 : 21 |
| 82 | – | 16 : 00 | 6 : 02 |
| 83 | 21 : 07 | 12 : 42 | 4 : 00 |
| 84 | 18 : 23 | 10 : 4.8 | 3 : 10 |
| 85 | 16 : 00 | 8 : 00 | 2 : 31 |
| 86 | 13 : 56 | 6 : 21 | 2 : 00 |
| 87 | 12 : 08 | 5 : 2.4 | 1 : 35 |
| 88 | 10 : 33 | 4 : 00 | 1 : 16 |
| 89 | 9 : 11 | 3 : 10 | 1 : 00 |
| 90 | 8 : 00 | 2 : 31 | 48 min |
| 91 | 6 : 58 | 2 : 00 | 38 m |
| 92 | 6 : 04 | 1 : 35 | 30 m |
| 93 | 5 : 17 | 1 : 16 | 24 m |
| 94 | 4 : 36 | 1 : 00 | 19 m |
| 95 | 4 : 00 | 0 : 48 | 15 m |
| 96 | 3 : 29 | 0 : 38 | 12 m |
| 97 | 3 : 02 | 0 : 30 | 9.4 m |
| 98 | 2 : 38 | 0 : 24 | 7.5 m |
| 99 | 2 : 18 | 0 : 19 | 6 m |
| 100 | 2 : 00 | 0 : 15 | 4 m 43 sec |
| 101 | 1 : 44 | 0 : 12 | 3 m 45 s |
| 102 | 1 : 31 | 9 min 24 sec | 2 m 58 s |
| 103 | 1 : 19 | 7 m 30 s | 2 m 22 s |
| 104 | 1 : 09 | 6 m | 1 m 53 s |
| 105 | 1 : 00 | 4 m 42 s | 1 m 29 s |
| 106 | 52 m | 3 m 48 s | 1 m 11 s |
| 107 | 45 m | 3 m | 56 s |
| 108 | 40 m | 2 m 24 s | 45 s |
| 109 | 34 m | 1 m 54 s | 36 s |
| 110 | 30 m | 1 m 30 s | 28 s |

Permissible noise levels in different countries
| Country | TWA, dBA (for an 8-hour shift) | Level increase corresponding to doubling the dose (Exchange rate) |
|---|---|---|
| Argentina | 90 | 3 |
| Australia | 85 | 3 |
| Brazil | 85 | 5 |
| Canada | 85 & 82 | 3 |
| Chile | 85 | 5 |
| China | 70–90 | 3 |
| European Union countries | 85 | 3 |
| Finland | 85 | 3 |
| France | 85 | 3 |
| Germany | 85, 70, 55 | 3 |
| Hungary | 85 | 3 |
| India | 90 | – |
| Israel | 85 | 5 |
| Italy | 85 | 3 |
| Netherlands | 80 | 3 |
| New Zealand | 85 | 3 |
| Norway | 85, 55, 70 | 3 |
| RF | 80 | 3 |
| Spain | 85 | 3 |
| Sweden | 85 | 3 |
| United Kingdom | 85 | 3 |
| USA | 90 (100)* | 5 |
| Uruguay | 90 | 3 |
OSHA issued a directive to inspectors in 1983. They are ordered to stop requiring employers to install engineering noise control if noise dose < 100 dBA. This decision is considered illegal, but it is carried out in practice in most US states.

These numerical values do not fully reflect the real situation. For example, the standard by the American Occupational Safety and Health Administration (OSHA) sets the Action Level 85 dBA, and the PEL 90 dBA. But in practice, the Compliance Safety and Health Officer must record the excess of these values with a margin, in order to take into account the potential measurement error. And, in fact, instead of PEL 90 dBA, it turns out 92 dBA, and instead of AL 85 dBA – 87 dBA.

Different types of hearing protection may be used to maximize hearing protection. OSHA regulations dictate whether hearing protection is required and if the company must participate in a hearing conservation program. But many employers are not implementing these programs effectively, and the risk of hearing loss is not reduced.

== Hunting and firearms ==
The shooting of guns for recreational use can lead to hearing loss in the high frequencies. The shooting of firearms can cause damage to a variety of cochlear structures due to the high peak sound pressure levels that they generate. This can range from 140 to 175 dB.

Along with the passive noise reduction options usually used vocationally (such as earmuffs and earplugs) there are also active noise reduction devices available. Active noise reduction technology is used to provide noise protection like passive options, but also use circuitry to give audibility to sounds that are below a dangerous level (about 85 dB) and try to limit the average output level to about 82 to 85 dB to keep the exposure at a safe level.

Strategies to help protect one's hearing from firearms also include using muzzle brakes and suppressors, shooting fewer rounds, and avoiding using a firearm with a short barrel. It is recommended to shoot outdoors or in a sound-treated environment, rather than a reverberant environment (an enclosed area with sound-reflecting surfaces). If there are multiple people shooting, make sure there is a large distance between the shooters and that they are not firing at the same time.

== Types ==
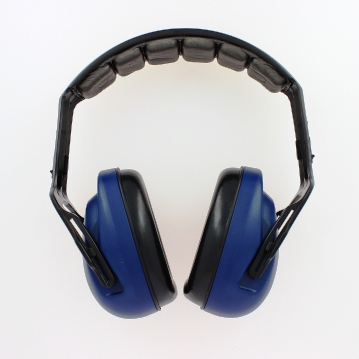
Earmuff hearing protection device.

Types of ear protection include:

- Earmuffs, external: This ear protection fits snug around the person's external ear. With this type of equipment, the ear is completely enclosed by a hard plastic shell, which is padded at the point of contact and otherwise lined with sound-absorbing and cushioning foam.
- Earplugs, internal: These are ear protection that fit inside of the person's ear canal. There are many different types of ear plugs. The most commonly known are foam, musician, or custom earplugs that are made from a mold of a person's ear.
- Helmet, covering various parts of the head, including the ears

In some occasions, multiple types of ear protection can be used together to increase the NRR. For example, foam earplugs can be worn in-conjunction with earmuffs.

Each type of ear protection has what is called a noise reduction rating (NRR). This gives the consumer an estimate of how much noise is being reduced before reaching the individual's ear. It is important for the consumer to know that this is only a single number estimate derived from a laboratory experiment, and the NRR will vary per individual wearing the hearing protection. NIOSH and OSHA have derating values to help give the person an idea of how much sound is being attenuated while wearing the hearing protection. OSHA uses a half derating, while NIOSH uses 70% for pre-formed earplugs, 50% for formable earplugs, and 25% for earmuffs.

But all such derating are not consistent with each other, and do not take into account the individual characteristics of the worker.

| Country, organization | Earplugs | | Earmuffs |
| Country, organization | formable | pre-formed | Earmuffs |
|---|---|---|---|
| USA, OSHA | Decrease by 2 times | Decrease by 2 times | Decrease by 2 times |
| USA, NIOSH | Decrease by 2 times | Decrease by 3.3 times | Decrease by 1.33 times |
| Italy | Decrease by 2 times | Decrease by 3.3 times | Decrease by 1.33 times |
| Great Britain | 4 dB reduction | 4 dB reduction | 4 dB reduction |
| France | 10 dB reduction | 10 dB reduction | 5–7 dB reduction |
| Germany | 9 dB reduction | 5 dB reduction | 5 dB reduction |

Therefore, no derating allows the specialist to predict the noise attenuation of a particular model for a particular worker. That is, the use of laboratory test results (NRR, SNR, HML, ets.) does not predict the effectiveness of the protection of a particular worker, at all. The range of actual values may be, for example, from 0 to 35 decibels.

=== Earmuffs ===
A toddler with ear protection at a wedding party

Earmuff style hearing protection devices are designed to fit over the outer ear, or pinna. Earmuff HPDs typically consist of two ear cups and a head band. Ear cups are usually lined with a sound-absorbing material, such as foam. The cups should be fit so that the center of the ear canal aligns with the ear canal opening. The soft cushions seal around the pinna of the ears. The head band, centered at the top of the head, applies force/pressure to seal the ear cups over the ears.

=== Earplugs ===
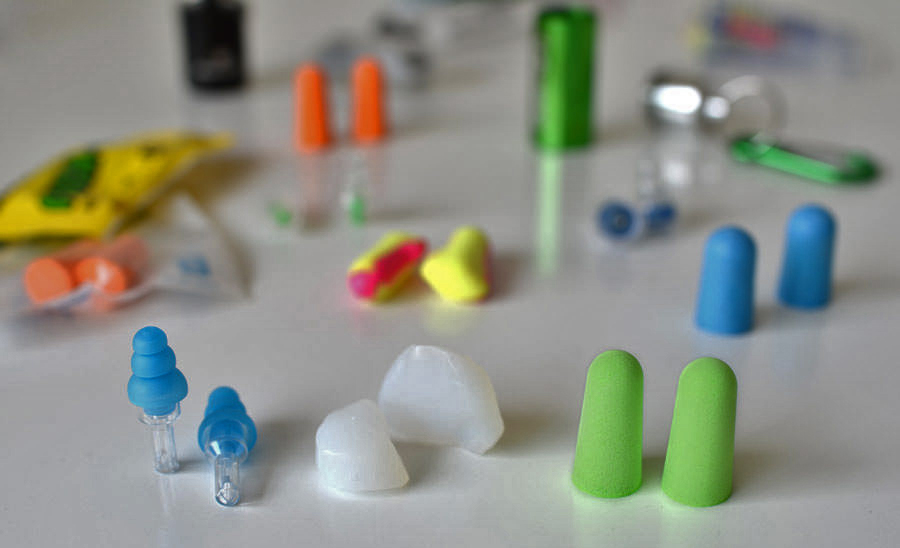
Different styles of earplugs are pictured. Left, pre-molded earplugs. Center, formable earplugs. Right, roll-down foam earplugs.

Earplug style hearing protection devices are designed to fit in the ear canal. Earplugs come in a variety of different subtypes. The attenuation offered by these devices can be measured through hearing protection fit testing.

- Pre-molded earplugs have a preformed shape and a push-to-fit design.
- Formable earplugs are pliable and take the form of an individual's ear canal.
- Roll-down foam earplugs are one of the most commonly used earplugs, and are made from slow recovery foam which expands after it has been "rolled-down" and inserted in the ear canal, creating a tighter seal.
- Custom earplugs are made individually for each user following earmold impressions. Typically custom earplugs are purchased from an audiology clinic or hearing healthcare professional.

=== Electronic hearing protection devices ===
Some HPDs reduce the sound reaching the eardrum through a combination of electronic and structural components. Electronic HPDs are available in both earmuff and custom earplug styles. Electronic microphones, circuitry, and receivers perform active noise reduction, also known as noise-cancelling, in which a signal that is 180-degrees out-of-phase of the noise is presented, which in theory cancels the noise.

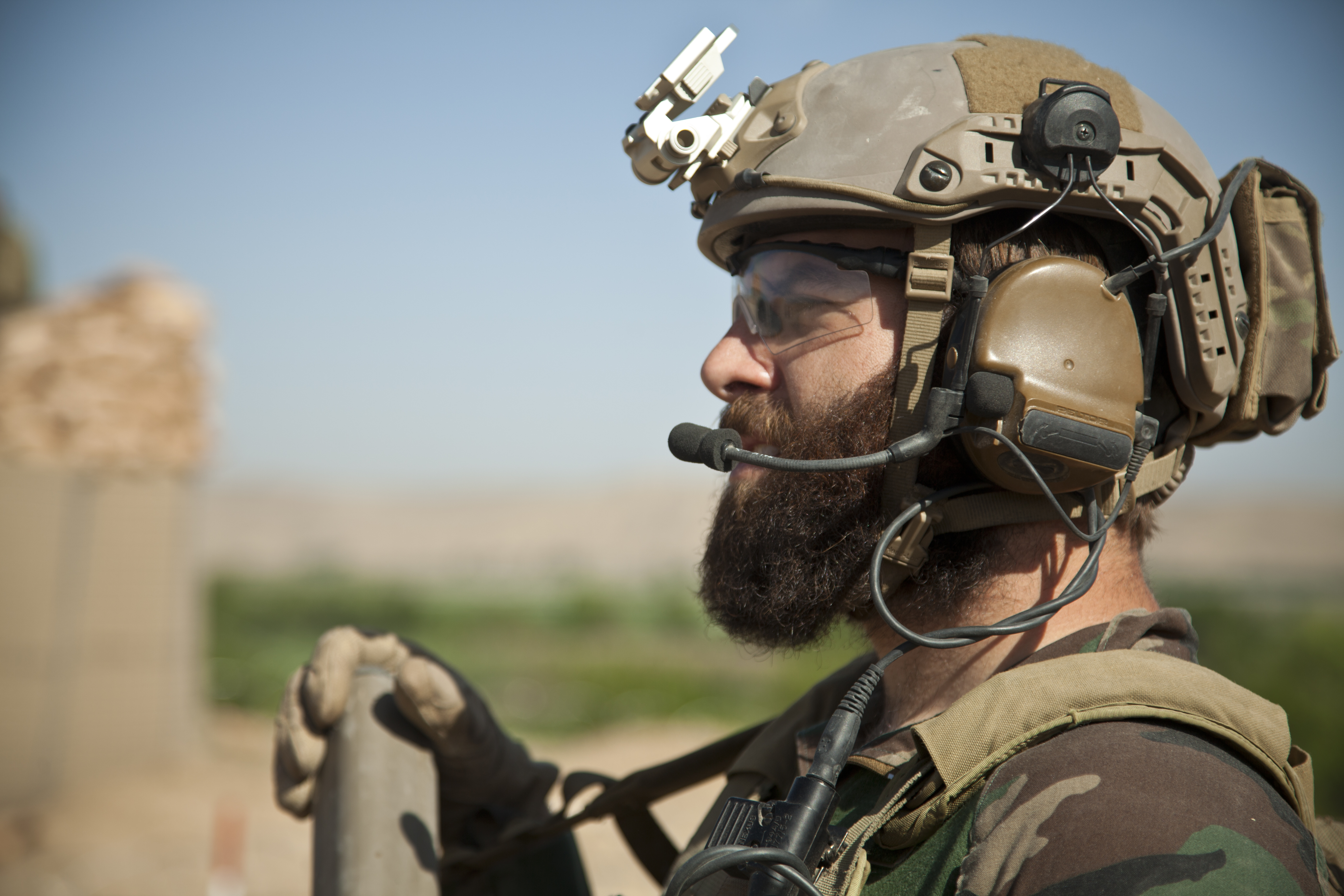
A U.S. Soldier wearing a hearing protection and communications headset.

Some electronic HPDs, known as Hearing Enhancement Protection Systems, provide hearing protection from high-level sounds while allowing transmission of other sounds like speech. Some also have the ability to amplify low-level sounds. This type may be beneficial for users who are in noisy environments, but still need access to lower level sounds. For example, soldiers who need to protect their hearing but also need to be able to identify enemy forces and communicate in noise, hunters who rely on detecting and localizing soft sounds of wildlife but still wish to protect their hearing from recreational firearm blasts, as well as users with pre-existing hearing loss who are in noisy environments may all benefit from In Ear Electronic Hearing Enhancement Protection Systems.

Electronic HPDs require the use of batteries and are typically more expensive than non-electronic types.

=== Semi-insert devices (canal caps) ===
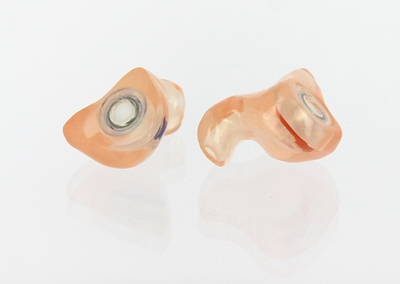
Custom earplug hearing protection devices.

Canal caps are similar to earplugs in that they consists of soft tip that is inserted into the opening of the ear canal. Some styles are inserted slightly into the ear canal while others sit in place at the opening of the ear canal. In this case, the tips or caps are connected by a lightweight band which also serves to hold them in position.

=== Dual hearing protection ===
Dual hearing protection refers to the use of earplugs under ear muffs. This type of hearing protection is particularly recommended for workers in the mining industry because they are exposed to extremely high noise levels, such as an 105 dBA TWA.} Fortunately, there is an option of adding electronic features to dual hearing protectors. These features help with communication by making speech more clear, especially for those workers who already have hearing loss.

The sound attenuation of a dual hearing protector is generally lower than the algebra sum of the attenuation of each single hearing protector. This phenomenon can be caused by the mechanical coupling between the earplug and earmuff through the human tissues, the vibration of the ear canal wall, or the bone conducted sound travelling from the head and body directly to the middle and inner ears. As a rule of thumb, the noise reduction rating of a dual hearing protector can be estimated by adding a 5 dB correction factor to the higher noise reduction rating of the two single hearing protectors.

== Hygiene and care ==
In order to prevent irritation or infection of the ear, reusable HPDs should be cleaned on a regular basis. Before using any HPD, it should be inspected for damage or dirt to ensure that it is safe to use. Single-use, disposable earplugs are available in addition to reusable options. Earplugs intended for single-use should not be washed for reuse as this degrades the material and reduces effectiveness.

Most reusable earplugs can be cleaned using mild soap and warm water between uses and should be replaced every 2–4 weeks. Earmuff cups and cushions should be cleaned regularly with soap and water, and be replaced if they become cracked or otherwise compromised. Ear cushions can last from 3–8 months depending on use. Use of a clean, protective case to store HPDs when not in use is recommended to prevent damage or contamination.

Any damage to a HPD can compromise its integrity, thus reducing its effectiveness. Damaged HPDs should not be used.

== Requirements of the law and recommendations of specialists ==
Many countries require several interventions to control risks from exposures to loud noise in the workplace. For example, US Occupational Safety and Health Administration requires hearing conservation programs which include the provision of hearing protection devices. This does not mean that OSHA considers HPDs to be effective. In fact, the document directly indicates their unreliability.

It is also recommended by the U.S. National Institute for Occupational Safety and Health, audiologists and other hearing healthcare professionals when one works exposed to noise levels that exceed 85 dB. NIOSH base their recommendations for use of hearing protection by a calculation called time-weighted average (TWA). A time-weighted average is the average noise level a worker is exposed to over a period of time. NIOSH recommends that OSHA use an 85 dBA time-weighted average during an 8-hour period as their exposure limit. An 85 dBA time-weighted average means that HPD use is recommended if an employee is exposed to an average noise level of 85 dBA or more during an 8-hour work day. NIOSH also uses a 3 dB exchange rate for time-weighted averages. A 3 dB exchange rate means that for every 3 dB increase in the average level of noise the recommended time being exposed to that level of noise is cut in half. For example, for a worker who is exposed to 88 dBA, it is recommended that he or she only be exposed to that level of noise for 4 hours. These levels of noise may be encountered in both occupational and recreational settings. HPDs are recommended for use in settings where it is difficult to control the noise level, and the person exposed to the noise cannot be removed from the environment.

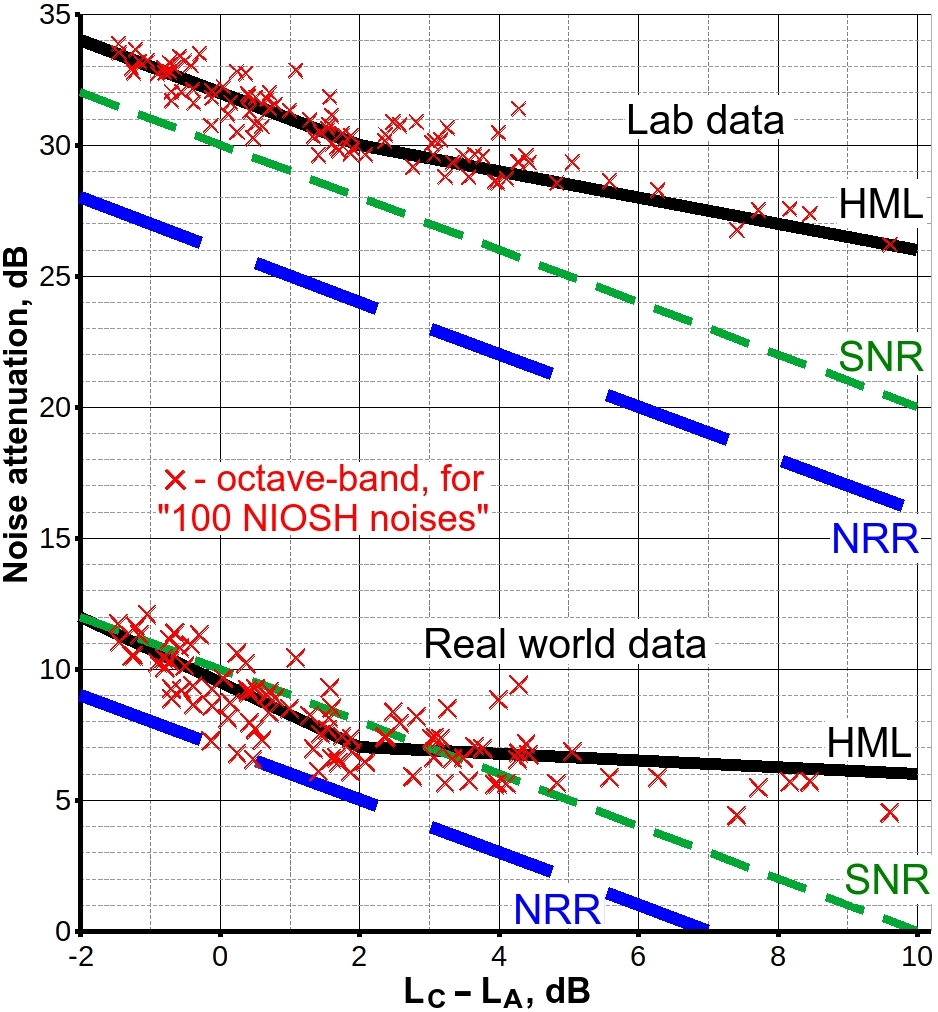
Noise reduction, earplugs EP100 (Willson). Top: measurements in the laboratory, and performance ratings. Bottom: real-world data

The amount of protection from noise can vary based on the physical fit of the device and the skill of the worker. Hearing protection devices with accurate placement (an airtight seal) and accurate insertion (deep into the ear canal) will provide the most attenuation of noise. There are many challenges to achieving the needed protection from the device, from barriers to adequate use, to issues related to comfort, convenience, lack of training, to beliefs and attitudes towards its use.

== HPD noise reduction: on label (NRR, SNR, HML, SLC80), and real noise attenuation (at workplaces) ==
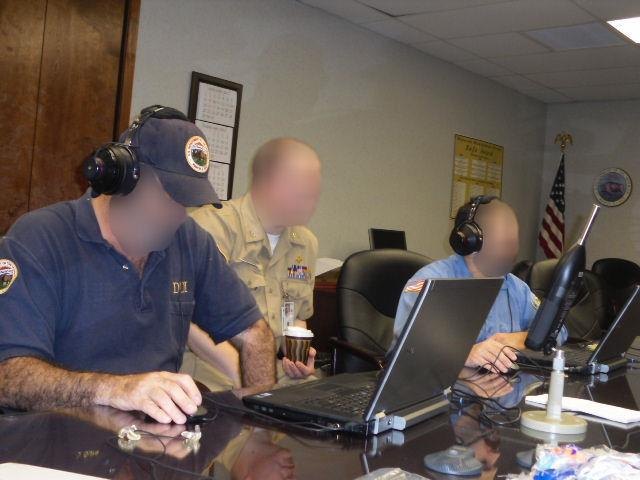
Hearing protector fit-testing

Hearing protection device manufacturers in the United States are required by the EPA to label HPDs with a noise reduction rating, or NRR. The NRR estimates how much noise is reduced by a hearing protection device, measured in decibels.

The NRR is measured by manufacturers using American National Standards Institute (ANSI) specified procedures in a laboratory environment. But noise attenuation when workers use HPD was much more variable, and much weaker than when they were tested in laboratories. This was shown both by the first two studies (NIOSH) and many subsequent works in the different countries (example).

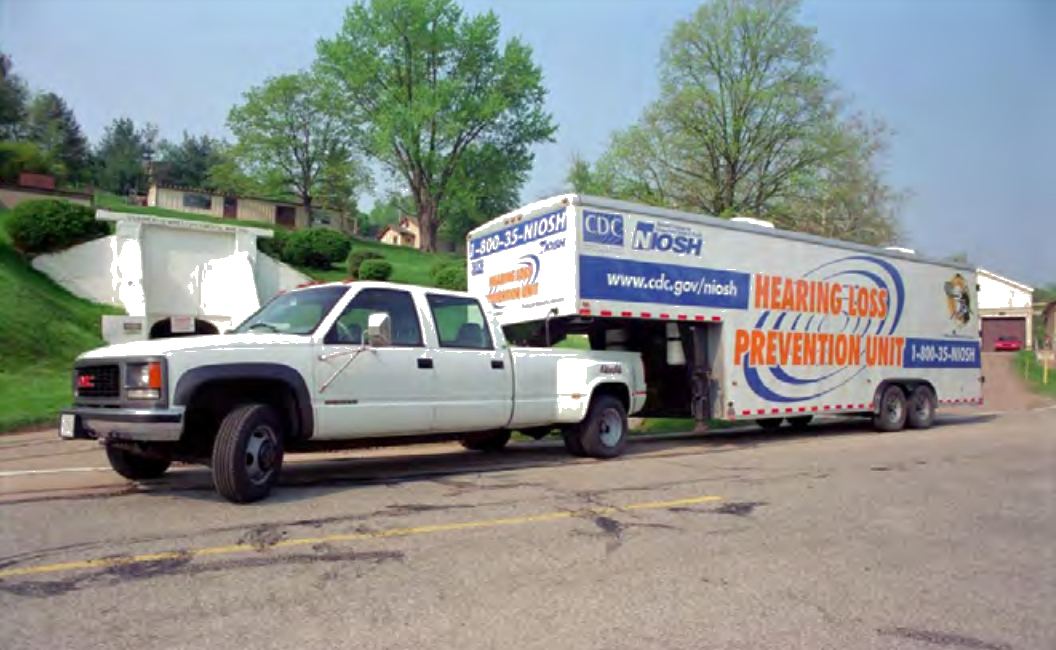
An example of a NIOSH mobile laboratory for measuring sound thresholds, and the real attenuation of workers earplugs

There were no technical means to take into account the variability of the HPD noise attenuation in different workers for a long time. For this reason, specialists (NIOSH and others) have tried to take at least palliative measures. They recommended that employers estimate the average noise attenuation of workers based on the average noise attenuation of testers in the lab – with correction (de-rating). However, in fact, the result of such manipulations did not provide any information about the noise attenuation of a particular worker.

The advent of new technologies has solved the problem, and individual measurement of noise attenuation is considered the most promising trend in personal noise protection Hearing protection fit-testing has been developed in order to determine the actual attenuation of the device as it is worn for an individual. These tests for checking attenuation values summarize the real-world attenuation in a personal attenuation rating (PAR). The PAR is unique to the HPD tested and the individual wearing the protection, and personal fit testing US OSHA and the National Hearing Conservation Association (NHCA) Alliance recommend that employers conduct individual worker noise attenuation measurements (HPD fit-testing) as a best practice and valuable tool for improving employee training. In order to achieve significant attenuation, fit-testing and extensive personalized (one-on-one) training was found to be essential, whereas simple instructions did not lead to significant attenuation over giving no instructions at all.

Following field studies on the implementation and effectiveness of hearing protection fit-testing, standards and regulations for Hearing Protector Fit Testing are under development or being implemented in several countries.

NIOSH has tried to alleviate the problem by developing a freely available program (online) for evaluating noise attenuation with liners. It can identify workers who do not know how to insert earplugs, or when workers are given such models that do not fit their ear canals.

Researchers at NIOSH tried to develop methods for predicting noise attenuation in workers in the early 1970s. This attempt was made just before the first measurements of noise attenuation in factories, among workers. The work was carried out under the following conditions

1. Low frequency noise is attenuated worse than mid- and high-frequency noise.
2. Most employers did not have the means to measure the noise spectrum.
3. It was assumed that the average noise attenuation in workplaces is about the same as in laboratory conditions.
4. It was believed that the differences in noise attenuation among different workers are small.

The results have been used to develop NRR (SNR). When developing method No. 2, the authors used the available information about the characteristic noise in industry, in the US in the early 1950s, and the difference in the noise levels (dBC and dBA) to take into account its spectrum – as in the HML method later.

NIOSH fully took into account the significant difference between the real and laboratory effectiveness of personal protective equipment, but other organizations began to recommend similar methods, and they were fixed in state and international standards.

In January 2025 NIOSH published a Science Policy Update recommending employers use individual, quantitative fit testing to evaluate the attenuation received by workers from their hearing protection devices.

== Regulations and standards ==
=== International ===
- Standards and Regulations for Occupational Settings, Suter, A. In: The Noise Manual, Sixth edition, 2022. American Industrial Hygiene Association.

=== United States ===
- Occupational Safety and Health Administration (1983; 29 CFR 1910.95) requires the use of HPDs in occupational settings when the noise exposure levels are equal to or above an 8-hour time-weighted average of 90 dB-A.
- Mine Safety and Health Administration (1999; 30 CFR Part 62) provides similar regulations as OSHA (above), but further requires simultaneous use of both earplugs and earmuffs when exposure levels exceed a time-weighted average of 105 dB-A.
- U.S. Department of Defense (2004; Instruction 6055.12, Hearing Conservation Program, March 5, 2004)
- U.S. Navy and Marine Corps Public Health Center (2008; TM 6260.51.99-2)
- American National Standard for Construction Workers (American National Standards Institute/American Society of Safety Engineers, 2007; A10.46)

=== Europe ===
- European Commission Directive 2003/10/EC (European Parliament and Council, 2003)

== See also ==
- Earplug
- Hearing protection fit-testing
- Hearing loss
- Hierarchy of hazard controls
- Occupational hearing loss
- Noise-induced hearing loss
- Hearing conservation program
- Personal protective equipment
- Safe listening
