= Earplug =

Device to protect ears from loud noises

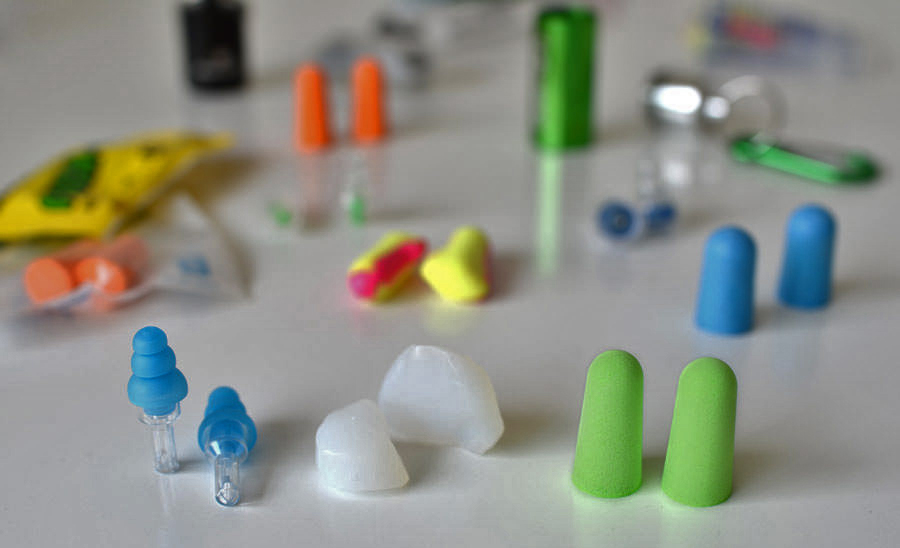
Pre-molded earplugs (left), formable earplugs (center), and roll-down foam earplugs (right)

An earplug is a device that is inserted in the ear canal to protect the user's ears from loud noises, intrusion of water, foreign bodies, dust, or excessive wind. Earplugs may also be used to improve sleep quality or focus in noisy environments. Since they reduce the sound volume, earplugs may prevent hearing loss and tinnitus (ringing of the ears) in some cases.

The US Occupational Safety and Health Administration requires hearing conservation programs, which include the provision of hearing protection devices (HPDs).

== History ==
The first recorded mention of the use of earplugs is in the Greek tale Odyssey, wherein Odysseus's crew is warned about the Sirens that sing from an island they will sail past. Circe, their hostess, tells them of the Sirens' bewitching song that makes men drive their boats ashore and perish. She advised Odysseus to fashion earplugs for his men from beeswax so they would not be lured to their deaths by the sirens' song.

In 1907, the German company Ohropax, which would produce mainly wax earplugs, was started by the German inventor Max Negwer. He did not invent anything, he just dropped cotton in melted wax and let it dry. Ray and Cecilia Benner invented the first moldable pure silicone ear plug in 1962. These earplugs were valued by swimmers because of their waterproof qualities, as well as those trying to avoid harmful noise. Ray Benner, who was a Classical musician, bought McKeon Products in 1962. At that time, the company's sole product was Mack's Earplugs (named after the original owner), which was a moldable clay earplug. The Benners quickly redesigned the product to a silicone version, which would become known as Mack's Pillow Soft Earplugs.

Present-day earplug material was discovered in 1967, at National Research Corporation (NRC) in the US by Ross Gardner Jr. and his team. As part of a project on sealing joints, they developed a resin with energy absorption properties. They came to call this material "E-A-R" (Energy Absorption Resin). In 1972 the material was refined into commercial memory foam earplugs, made from either polyvinyl chloride or polyurethane.

== Hearing protection ==
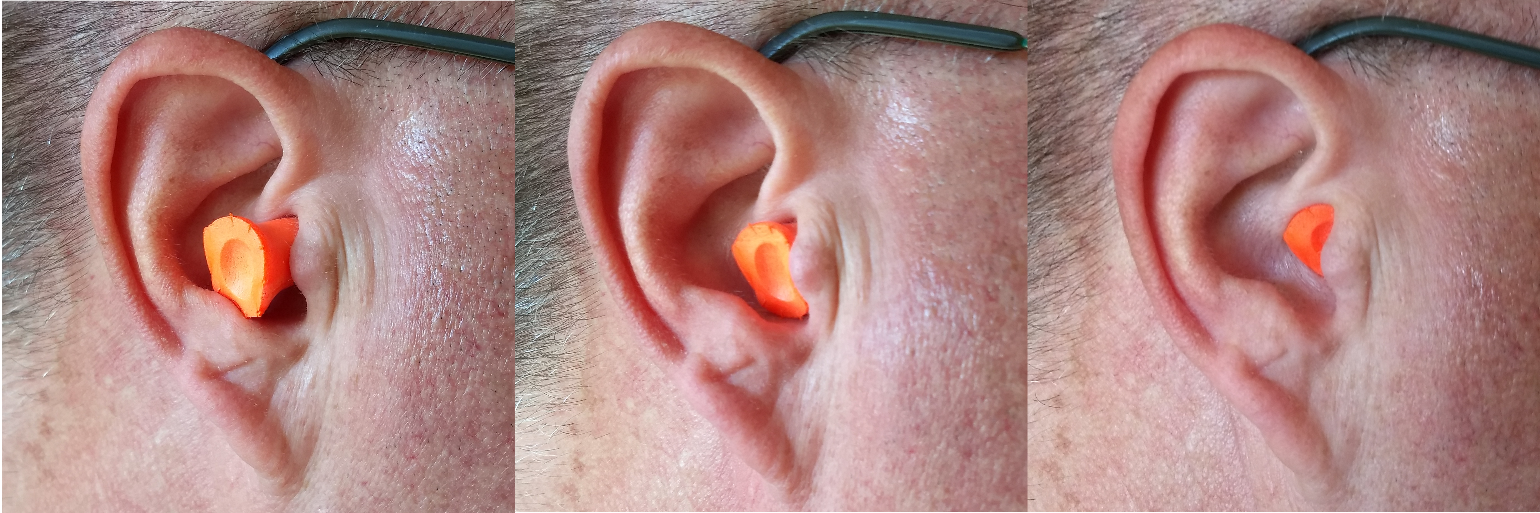
Badly-inserted earplug, semi-inserted earplug, and properly-inserted earplug

There are mainly four types of earplug fittings for hearing protection:

- Foam earplugs, mainly made from either polyvinyl chloride (PVC) or polyurethane (PU) (memory foam), which are compressed (rolled) and put into the ear canal, where they expand to plug it.
- Wax earplugs, which are rolled into a ball and carefully molded to fit over the external portion of the ear canal.
- Flanged silicone earplugs, an example of Universal-fit.
- Custom molded earplugs, made from a mold of the wearer's ear and designed to precisely fit all ear canal shapes. Custom molded is further divided into laboratory-made and "formed in place".

NIOSH Mining Safety and Health Research recommends using the roll, pull, and hold method when using memory foam earplugs. The process involves the user rolling the earplug into a thin rod, pulling back on the ear, and holding the earplug deep in the ear canal with the finger. To get a complete seal, the user must wait about 20 to 30 seconds for the earplug to expand inside the canal.

Earplugs are most effective when the wearer has been properly trained on use and insertion. Employers can provide this training before dispensing earplugs to their employees. Training for earplug use includes: insertion, a seal check, depth check, removal, cleaning, and replacement. When training on insertion, the objective is for the worker to understand the correct insertion strategy. Proper insertion training prevents inadequate insertion, that can result in discomfort or inadequate attenuation, which can result in hearing loss. When this step is achieved, then the seal and depth need to be checked. The ear plugs all have a desired depth and seal which need to be achieved to provide the designated attenuation for the wearer. The worker will also be trained on how to properly remove the earplugs and clean them. This allows for multiple uses and reduces the chance of infection. To further prevent infection, it is important the worker understands when they will need to replace their earplugs. Once the plugs have been worn down from repeated use, they will no longer seal correctly or provide the proper attenuation level, and the device will need to be replaced.

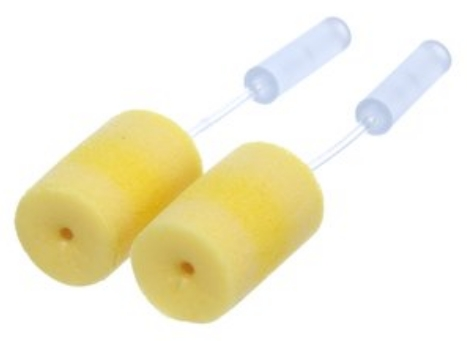
Earplugs with probe for MIRE measurements of noise exposure on the worker's eardrums

Noise attenuation can be verified using real-ear attenuation at threshold (REAT) or microphone in the real ear (MIRE) methods. The difference in thresholds with and without the hearing protection in place determines the amount of attenuation (REAT). Two microphones measure the sound pressure (of test signals, or noise in the workplace during a shift) outside the HPD and inside, and the difference shows the noise attenuation (MIRE).

Earplugs and other hearing protection devices can be tested to ensure that they fit properly and are successfully limiting sound exposure, which is called fit-testing. There are a number of different fit-testing systems, also known as field attenuation estimation systems (FAES). These use large headphones or specialized (surrogate) earplugs to transmit the test sounds and measure the attenuation provided by the hearing protector. These systems include the NIOSH HPD Well-Fit, Honeywell Howard Leight VeriPRO, 3MEARFit and many others.

Noise, dBA	Time reaching maximum daily dose, hours : minutes		
Noise, dBA	OSHA, TWA 90 dB(A), exchange rate 5 dB	NIOSH, TWA 85 dB(A), exchange rate 3 dB	ISO 1999, Netherlands, RF TWA 80 dB(A), exchange rate 3 dB
80	-	-	8 : 00
81	-	20 : 9.5	6 : 21
82	-	16 : 00	6 : 02
83	21 : 07	12 : 42	4 : 00
84	18 : 23	10 : 4.8	3 : 10
85	16 : 00	8 : 00	2 : 31
86	13 : 56	6 : 21	2 : 00
87	12 : 08	5 : 2.4	1 : 35
88	10 : 33	4 : 00	1 : 16
89	9 : 11	3 : 10	1 : 00
90	8 : 00	2 : 31	48 min
91	6 : 58	2 : 00	38 m
92	6 : 04	1 : 35	30 m
93	5 : 17	1 : 16	24 m
94	4 : 36	1 : 00	19 m
95	4 : 00	0 : 48	15 m
96	3 : 29	0 : 38	12 m
97	3 : 02	0 : 30	9.4 m
98	2 : 38	0 : 24	7.5 m
99	2 : 18	0 : 19	6 m
100	2 : 00	0 : 15	4 m 43 sec
101	1 : 44	0 : 12	3 m 45 s
102	1 : 31	9 min 24 sec	2 m 58 s
103	1 : 19	7 m 30 s	2 m 22 s
104	1 : 09	6 m	1 m 53 s
105	1 : 00	4 m 42 s	1 m 29 s
106	52 m	3 m 48 s	1 m 11 s
107	45 m	3 m	56 s
108	40 m	2 m 24 s	45 s
109	34 m	1 m 54 s	36 s
110	30 m	1 m 30 s	28 s

Permissible noise levels in different countries
Country	TWA, dBA (for an 8-hour shift)	Level increase corresponding to doubling the dose (Exchange rate)
Argentina	90	3
Australia	85	3
Brazil	85	5
Canada	85 & 82	3
Chile	85	5
China	70-90	3
European Union countries	85	3
Finland	85	3
France	85	3
Germany	85, 70, 55	3
Hungary	85	3
India	90	-
Israel	85	5
Italy	85	3
Netherlands	80	3
New Zealand	85	3
Norway	85, 55, 70	3
RF	80	3
Spain	85	3
Sweden	85	3
United Kingdom	85	3
USA	90 (100)*	5
Uruguay	90	3
OSHA issued a directive to the Compliance Safety and Health Officers in 1983. They are ordered to stop requiring employers to install engineering noise control if noise dose < 100 dBA. This decision is considered illegal, but it is carried out in practice in most US states. These numerical values do not fully reflect the real situation. For example, the OSHA standard sets the Action Level 85 dBA, and the PEL 90 dBA. But in practice, the Compliance Safety and Health Officer must record the excess of these values with a margin, in order to take into account the potential measurement error. And, in fact, instead of PEL 90 dBA, it turns out 92 dBA, and instead of AL 85 dBA - 87 dBA.

== Types and use cases ==
The diameter of the ear canals can be from 3 to 14 mm. They can be round, elliptical, and even slit-like. The ear canals may be straight, but more often curved to varying degrees. The shape and size of the right and left ear canals for the same worker can vary significantly. Installing the earplugs neatly and tightly (without gaps) can be a difficult task.

Since the fitting of the earplugs greatly affects their noise attenuation, various designs of these personal protective equipment have been developed.

=== Simple earplugs ===
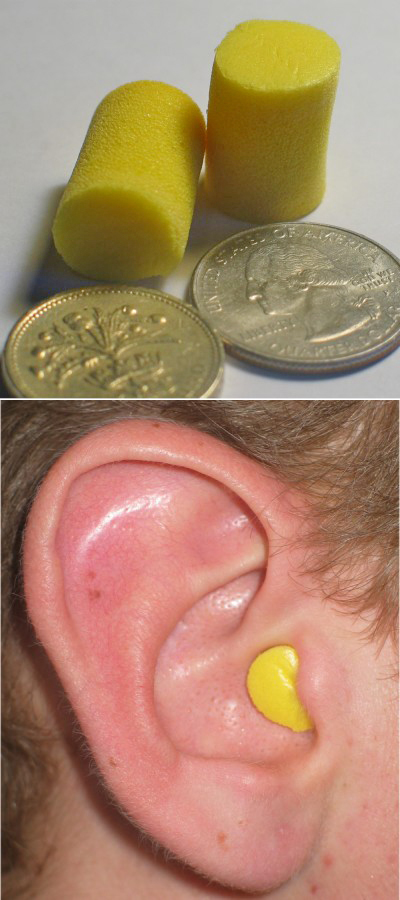
Disposable foam earplugs: with coins for scale (top) and inserted into the wearer's ear.

Basic foam style earplug protection is often worn by industrial workers who work within hearing distance of loud machinery for long periods of time, and is used by the British Ministry of Defence (MoD) for soldiers to use when firing weapons. Earplugs are rated for their ability to reduce noise; see § Rating.

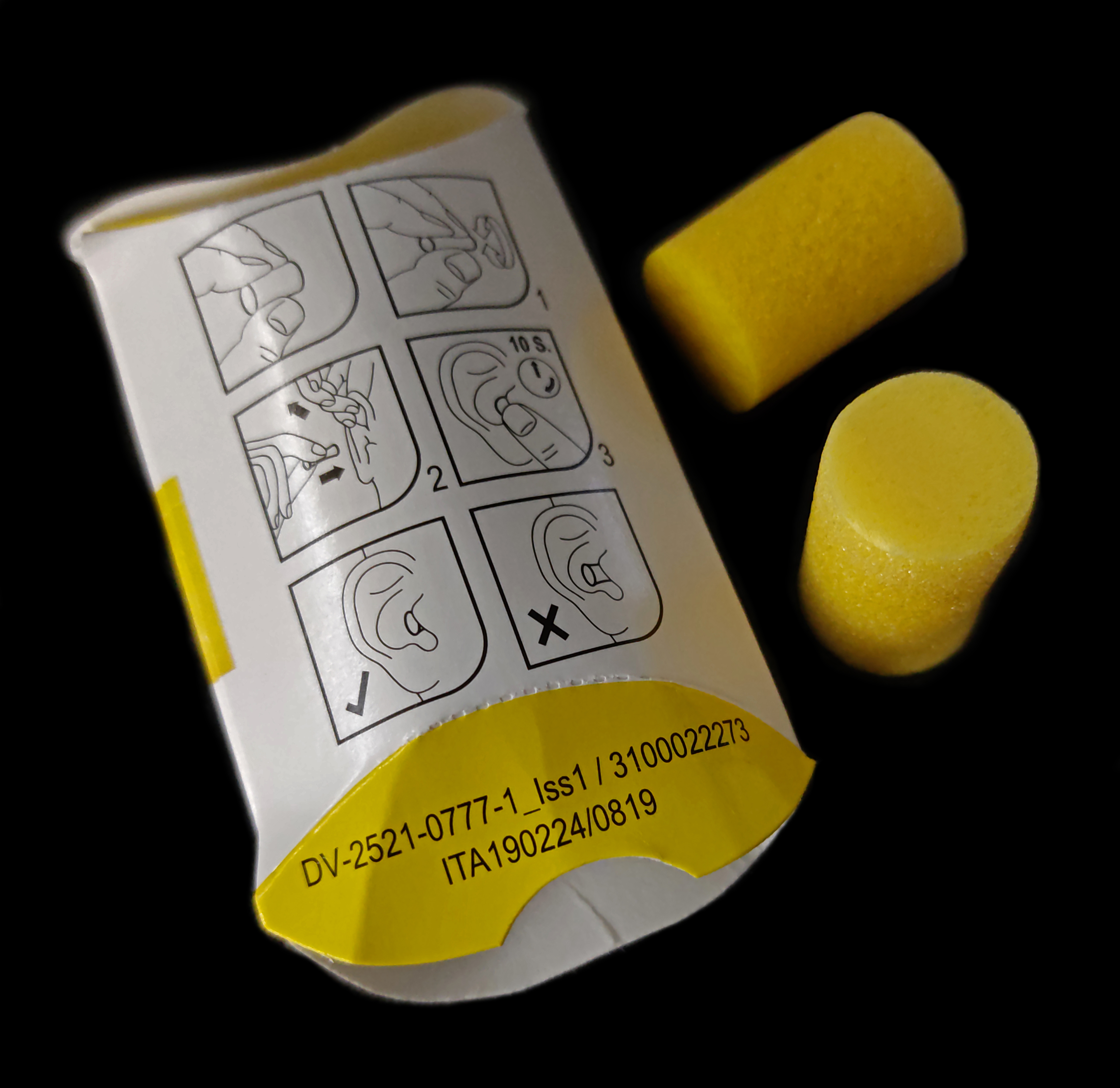
Earplugs with instructions for use

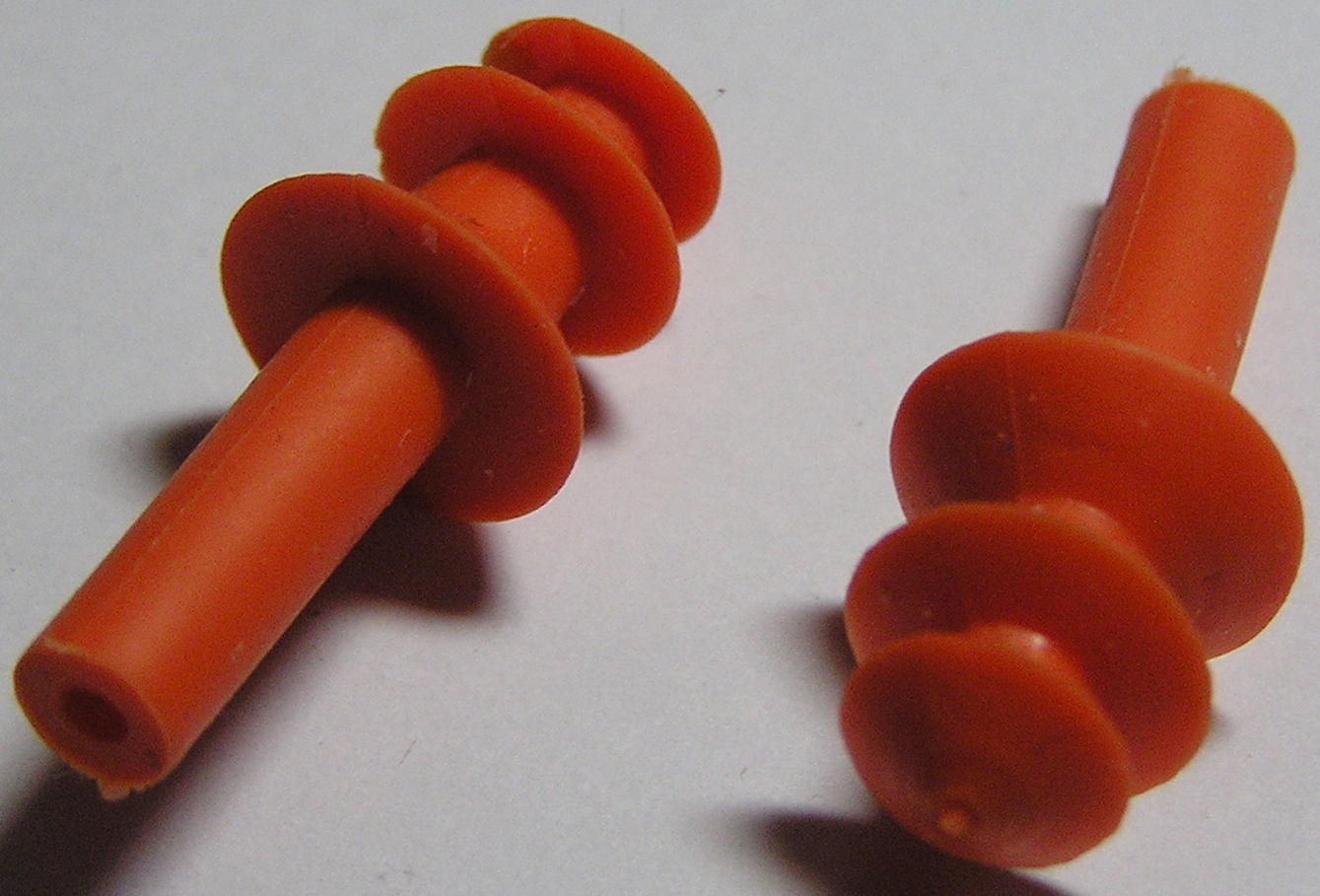
Flanged earplugs made from silicone rubber. The hole in the left plug is the input port and extends as far as the central flange where the attenuation occurs.

Most disposable earplugs are elastic ones made of memory foam, that is typically rolled into a tightly compressed cylinder (without creases) by the user's fingers and then inserted in the ear canal. Once released, the earplug expands until it seals the canal, blocking the sound vibrations that could reach the eardrum. Other disposable plugs simply push into the ear canal without being rolled first. Sometimes earplugs are connected with a cord to keep them together when not in use. Other common material bases for disposable earplugs are viscous wax or silicone.

Other devices that provide hearing protection include electronic devices worn around and/or in the ear, and are designed to cancel out the loud noise of a gunshot, while possibly amplifying quieter sounds to normal levels. While rich in features, these electronic devices are more expensive, compared to their foam counterparts.

In other activities, hobby motorcyclists and skiers may also choose to use decibel reduction earplugs to compensate for the ongoing noise of the wind against their head or helmet.

=== Musician's earplugs ===
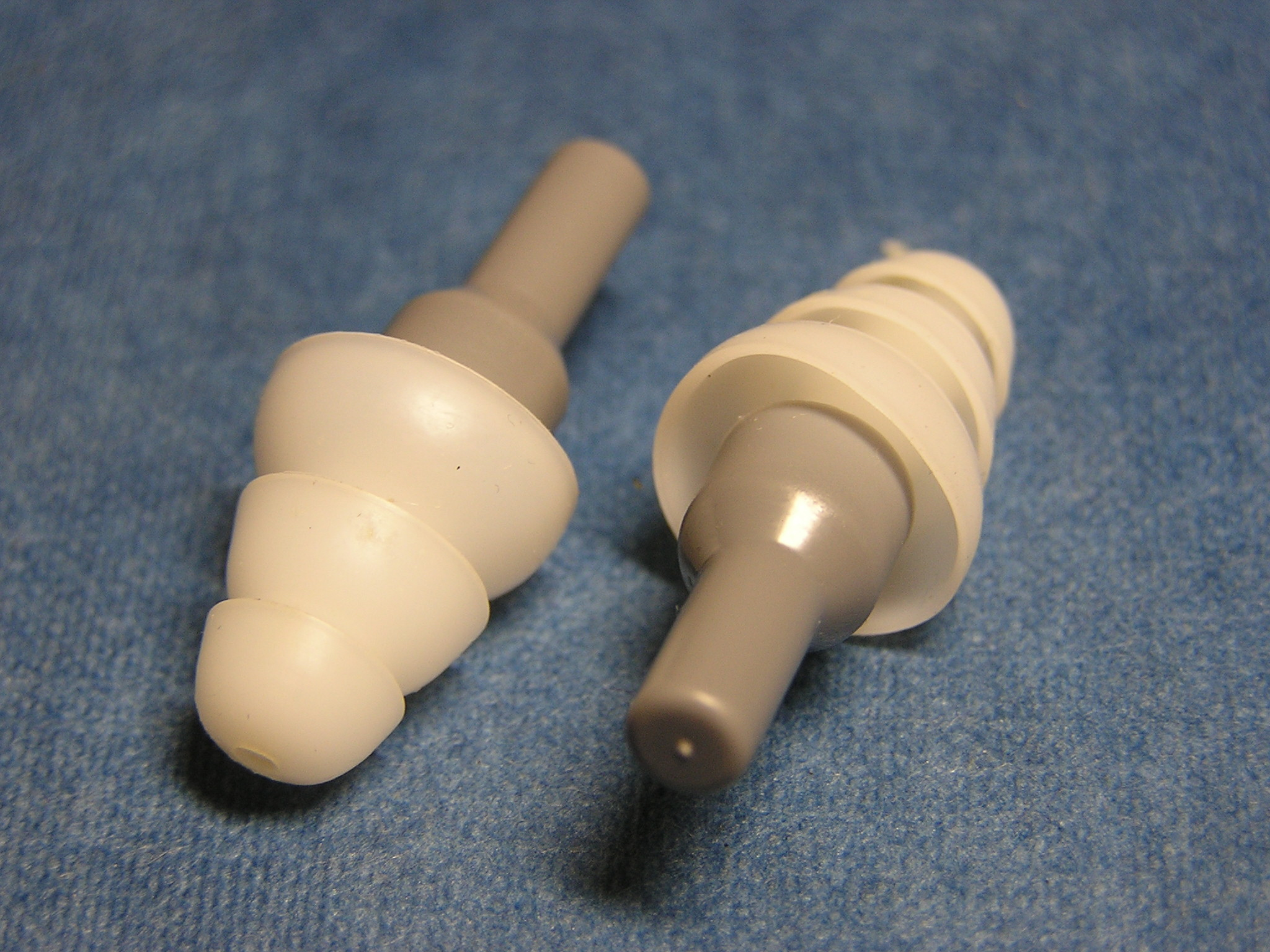
Musician's earplugs. The grey end caps contain an acoustic transmission line with a damper (attenuator) at the end while the domed flanges form a seal in the ear canal. The output port can just be seen as a small hole at the near end of the left plug.

Musicians are exposed to potentially harmful levels of sound, which can lead to hearing loss, tinnitus, and other auditory symptoms. Because of this, musicians may choose to use earplugs.

Musician's earplugs (also called Hi-Fi or Lossless earplugs) are designed to attenuate sounds evenly across all frequencies (pitches) which helps maintain the ear's natural frequency response and thus minimizes the effect on the user's perception of timbre (frequency spectrum, f.ex. bass and treble levels). These are commonly used by musicians and technicians, both in the studio and in concert, to avoid overexposure to high volume levels. Musicians' earplugs generally achieve a more natural frequency response by incorporating a small diaphragm or membrane together with acoustic channels and damping materials. Simpler variants with only a small hole introduce a low frequency leak, and will not achieve a flat frequency response.

Preformed earplugs are universal (non-custom) earplugs with a noise reduction rating (NRR) of about 12 dB. A selection of musicians' earplugs have been reviewed by the National Acoustic Laboratories and The HEARing CRC in conjunction with Choice. The review results (which include attenuation measures and user ratings of comfort, fit and sound quality) are available at What Plug?.

A more expensive option is the custom molded musicians' earplug, which is custom-made for the individual listener. These earplugs are typically made out of silicone or vinyl materials and come with a vent and a variety of filters that can change the amount of attenuation provided. Common static filter attenuation levels are 9, 15, and 25 dB. This type of plug is quite popular among audio engineers who are able to safely listen to loud mixes for extended periods of time. However, they can be quite costly, being intended for constant re-use unlike simple earplugs which are disposable.

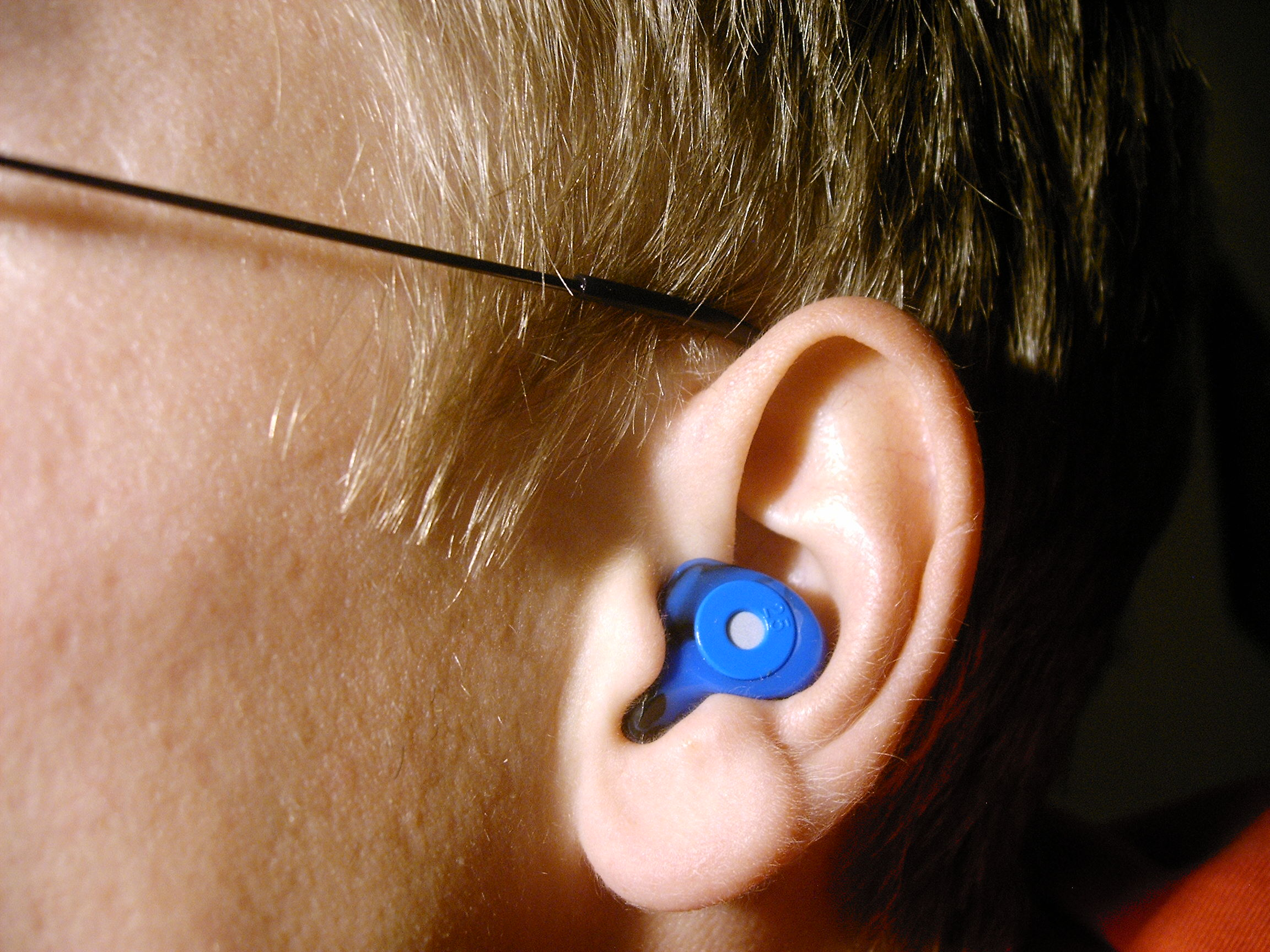
Custom earplugs worn by professional musicians

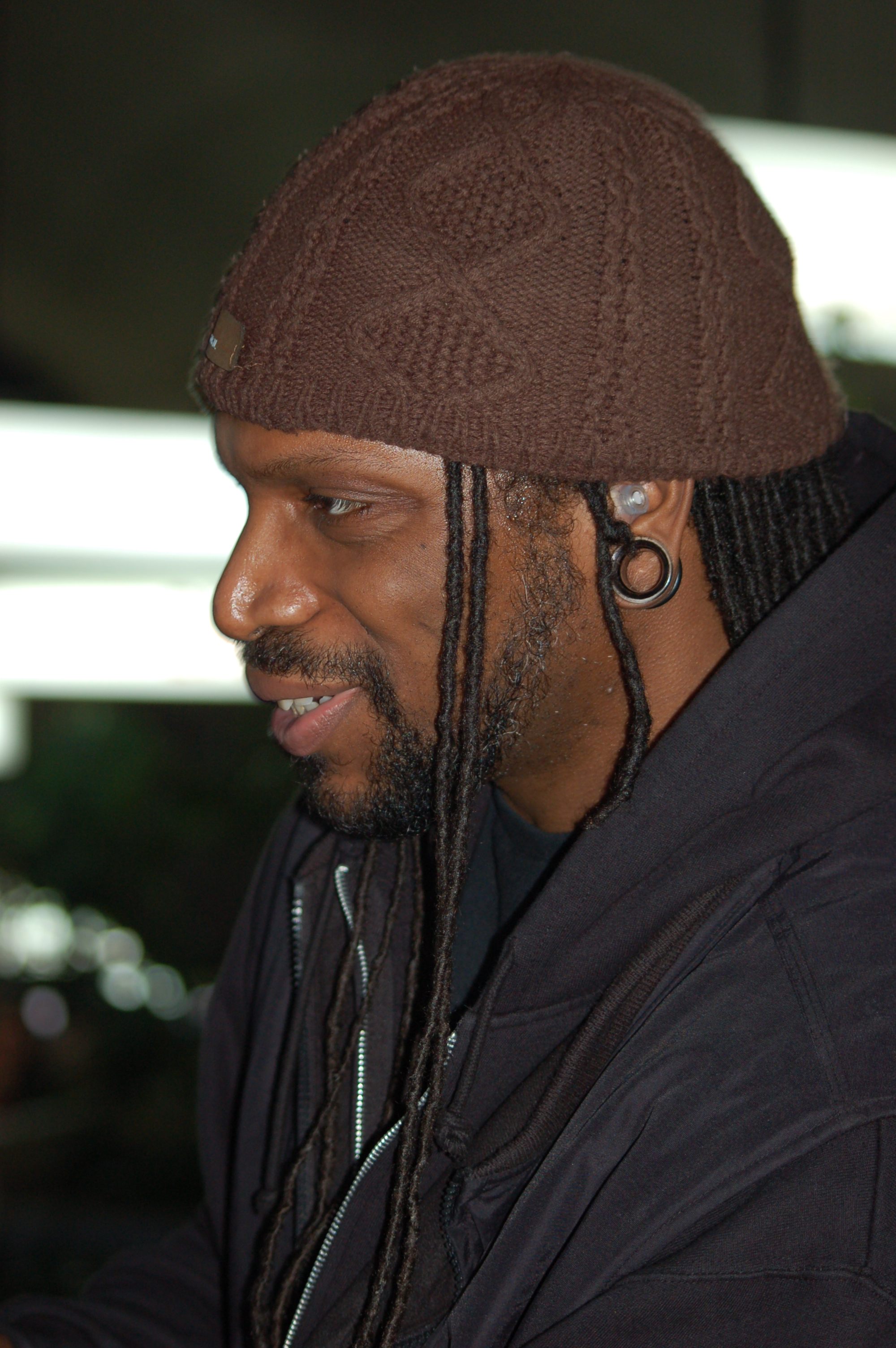
Lead singer of the metal band Sepultura Derrick Green wearing a custom earplug

Alternately, musicians may use in-ear monitors, which are essentially headphones that also serve as earplugs by attenuating surrounding sound. In order for in-ear monitors to double as hearing protection, custom earpieces should be used. The process for having custom earpieces made is similar to that of the custom musician's earplug and, similarly, the earpiece will be made of silicone or vinyl. While using an in-ear monitor can help protect hearing, the amount of protection provided by the monitor depends on the listening level that the musician chooses. Because of this, if the musician sets the monitor to a high level, the monitor may attenuate surrounding sound while still providing a potentially harmful level of sound directly to the musician's ear and therefore no longer serve a protective function.

Several earplugs on the market claim to be for musicians, but are not in fact by definition a musician's earplug. By having a thin acoustical bypass channel, they allow for a slightly better frequency response and lower attenuation than simple earplugs, but far from the level of fidelity that membrane-based earplugs provide. These types of earplugs do not provide the flat attenuation that is characteristic of a musician's plug, but may still be useful for some, due to their lower price points.

=== Custom molds ===
Earplugs can be molded to fit an individual's ear canal. This costs more, but can improve fit for the few percent that have an ear anatomy outside the norm.

Custom molded earplugs fall into two categories: Laboratory made and Formed in Place. Laboratory made requires an impression to be made by a professional of the ear canal and outer ear. The impression is sent to a laboratory to be checked and made into a hearing protector. Formed in place uses the same process to make an impression of the ear canal and outer ear and then turns that impression into the protector. Both types of custom molded earplugs are non-disposable with the laboratory made typically lasting for 3 to 5 years and the formed in place lasting for 1 to 2 years.

For the best attenuation and proper fit, the impressions for custom molds must meet a desired criteria by the manufacturer of the mold. Before an impression can be taken for the custom mold the ear canal is checked for any wax or physical abnormalities. This is important in making sure there is a proper seal with the impression material and also not to push any wax deep into the canal. An otoblock (made with foam or cotton) will be inserted deep in the canal to prevent the impression material from going too far. The impression material (either silicone or powder/liquid) will be placed into the ear canal. This will need to be fully made, making sure there are no gaps or creases in the impression. If there are, then the mold made from the impression will not adequately seal the ear canal. Once the custom mold is made, it will need to be inspected by the Audiologist for proper fit on the patient. Hearing protection should also be verified using real-ear methods to ensure proper attenuation. Real-ear attenuation at threshold (REAT) measurements test how narrowband noises of varying frequency are attenuated with and without the custom mold in place. Testing for low-frequency attenuation can help to verify the earmold fit while testing high-frequency attenuation can verify the properties of the filter used.

For best results, they are molded in the ear while in the position that they will be used. For instance, if they are to be used for sleeping then they should be molded in the ear while lying down, as different positioning of the jaws causes significant changes to the form of the ear canal, mostly a reduction of the diameter, risking the sleep earplug to be made too large otherwise. It is also important that during the impression process that a music performer use their embouchure or move the jaw to mimic singing in order to account for ear canal changes during performance. Therefore, if the impression is not properly constructed, then it will need to be redone. These changes can be felt by feeling with a finger just at the entrance to the ear canal while moving the jaws sideways, up and down or anterior and posterior.

Most molded earplugs are made from silicone but other materials may be used, including thermoplastics, plastic, nylon, and even 3D-printed earplugs.

=== Electronic earplugs ===
The noise reduction of passive earplugs varies with frequency but is largely independent of level (soft noises are reduced as much as loud noises). As a result, while loud noises are reduced in level, protecting hearing, it can be difficult to hear low level noises. Active electronic earplugs exist, where loud noises are reduced more than soft noises, and soft sounds may even be amplified, providing dynamic range compression. This is done by having a standard passive earplug together with a microphone/speaker pair (microphone on outside, speaker on inside; formally a pair of transducers), so sound can be transmitted without being attenuated by the earplug. When external sounds exceed an established threshold (typically 82 dBA SPL), the amplification of the electronic circuit is reduced. At very high levels, the amplification is turned off automatically and the full attenuation of the earplug is received, just as if it were turned off and seated in the ear canal. This protects hearing while allowing one to hear normally when sounds are in safe ranges – for example, having a normal conversation in a low-noise situation, but be protected from sudden loud noises, for example at a construction site or a while hunting.

=== Nonlinear earplugs ===
Nonlinear earplugs provide similar advantages to electronic earplugs but do not require electricity. They are designed with a thin diaphragm which allows the amount of noise reduction to increase in proportion to the sound level to which the wearer is exposed. This makes them useful for applications where situational awareness is required but noise protection is also necessary, such as the military or police.

=== Sleep ===
Earplugs for sleeping are made to be as comfortable as possible while blocking external sounds that may prevent or disrupt sleep. Specialized earplugs for such noises as a partner's snoring may have sound-dampening enhancements that enable the user to still hear other noises, such as an alarm clock.

To determine the comfort of earplugs used for sleeping, it is important to try them on while actually lying down. The pressure on the ear between the head and pillow may cause significant discomfort. Furthermore, just tilting the head back or to the side causes significant anatomical changes in the ear canal, mostly a reduction of the ear canal diameter, which may reduce comfort if the earplug is too large. Earplugs for sleeping may enhance recovery after major surgery.

=== Protection from water ===
Some earplugs are primarily designed to keep water out of the ear canal, especially during swimming and water sports. This type of earplug may be made of wax or moldable silicone which is custom-fitted to the ear canal by the wearer.

Exostosis, or surfer's ear, is a condition which affects people who spend large amounts of time in water in cold climates. In addition, wind may increase the prevalence of the amount of exostosis seen in one ear versus the other dependent on the direction it originates from and the orientation of the individual to the wind. Custom-fitted surfer's earplugs help reduce the amount of cold water and wind that is allowed to enter the external ear canal and, thus, help slow the progression of exostosis.

Another condition is otitis externa, which is an infection of the outer ear canal. This form of infection differs from those commonly occurring in children behind the eardrum, which is otitis media, or a middle ear infection. This infection's symptoms include: itchiness, redness, swelling, pain upon tugging of the pinna, or drainage. To protect from this form of infection, it is important to thoroughly dry the ears after exposing them to water with a towel. To protect the ears during exposure, the individual can use a head cap, ear plugs, or custom-fitted swim molds.

A 2003 study published in Clinical Otolaryngology found that a cotton ball saturated with petroleum jelly was more effective at keeping water out of the ear, was easier to use, and was more comfortable than wax plugs, foam plugs, EarGuard, or Aquafit.

Jacques-Yves Cousteau warned that earplugs are harmful to divers, especially scuba divers. Scuba divers breathe compressed air or other gas mixtures at a pressure matching the water pressure. This pressure is also inside the ear, but not between the eardrum and the earplug, so the pressure behind the eardrum will often burst the eardrum. Skin divers have less pressure inside the ears, but they also have only atmospheric pressure in the outer ear canal. The PADI (Professional Association of Diving Instructors) advises in the "Open Water Diver Manual" that only vented earplugs designed for diving should be used in diving.

=== Flight ear protection ===
Earplugs are also available which help to protect ears from the pain caused by airplane cabin pressure changes. Some products contain a porous ceramic insert which reportedly aids equalization of air pressure between the middle and outer ear thereby preventing pain during landings and take-offs. Some airlines distribute regular foam earplugs as part of their amenity kits for passengers to aid their comfort during landings and takeoffs as well as to reduce exposure to the aircraft's noise during the flight. These can help passengers get to sleep during the flight if desired.

== Noise attenuation, labeled (NRR, SNR, HML, SLC80) and real-world ==
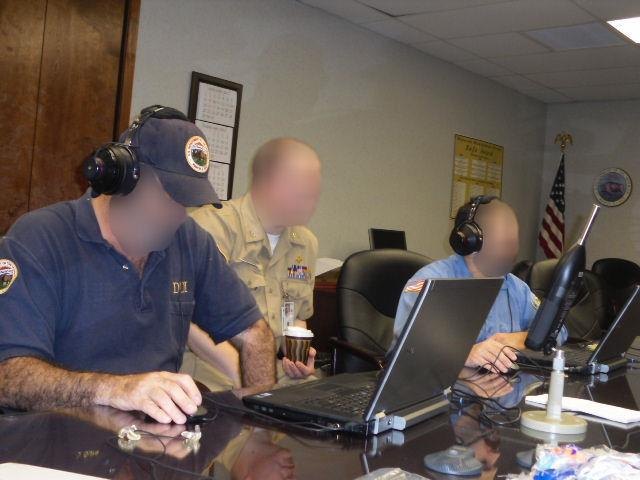
Hearing protection fit-testing

In the past, experts believed that HPDs noise attenuation in laboratories and workplaces were similar. Therefore, they developed different methods for predicting noise attenuation at the workplaces using lab data. Later, derating methods were developed. Many of these methods have been preserved in various regulatory documents and older standards.

Unfortunately, all these methods and derating do not take into account at all and are not able to take into account the strong individual variability in noise attenuation in principle, for example, plus or minus 20 decibels.

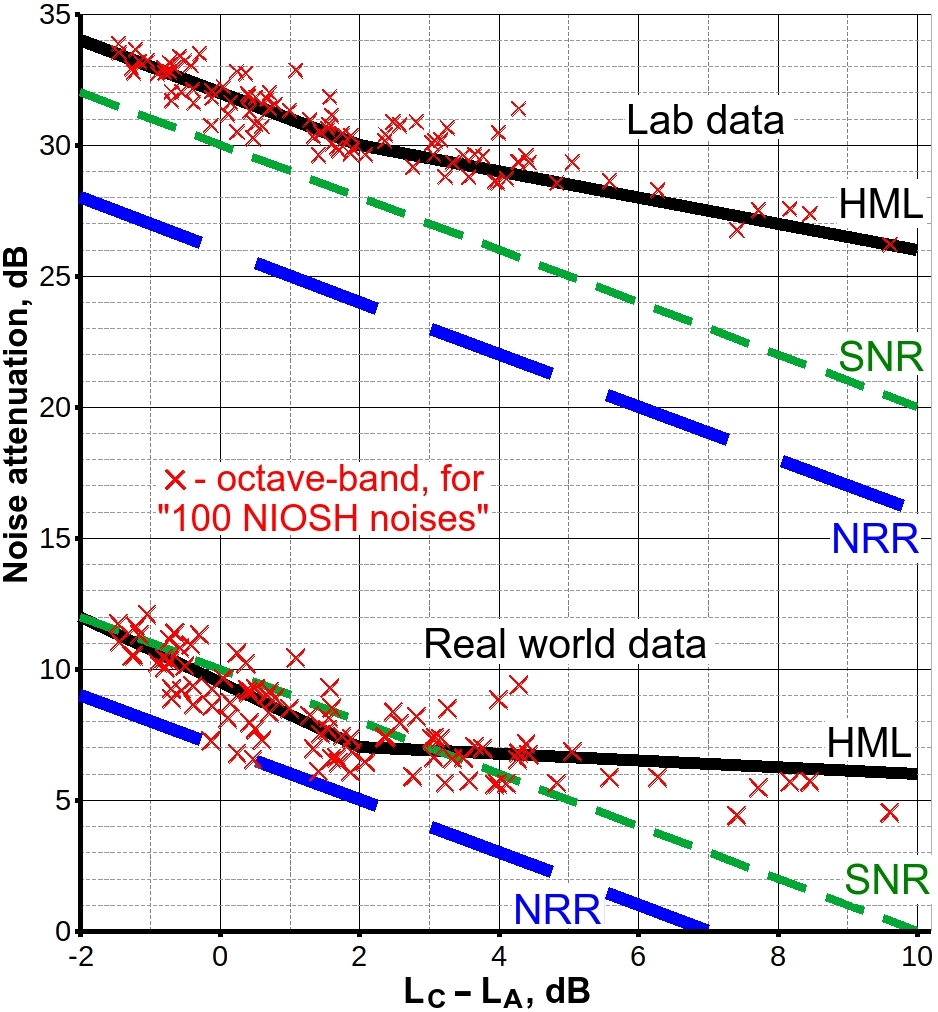
Noise attenuation, earplugs EP100. The difference between laboratory predictions (top) and real-world data (bottom)

New standards have been developed that better correspond to the current level of science.

=== Rating ===
The United States Environmental Protection Agency (EPA) mandates that hearing protection is rated and labeled. To be rated, hearing protection is tested under ANSI S3.19-1974 to provide a range of attenuation values at each frequency that can then be used to calculate a Noise Reduction Rating (NRR). Under this standard a panel of ten subjects are tested three times each in a laboratory to determine the attenuation over a range of 9 frequencies.

In the European Union, hearing protectors are required to be tested according to the International Organization for Standardization (ISO) acoustical testing standard, ISO 4869 Part 1 and the Single Number Rating (SNR) or High/Middle/Low (HML) ratings are calculated according to ISO 4869 Part 2. In Brazil, hearing protectors are tested according to the American National Standards Institute ANSI S12.6-1997 and are rated using the Noise Reduction Rating Subject Fit NRR(SF). Australia and New Zealand have different standards for protector ratings yielding a quantity SLC80 (Sound Level Class for the 80th percentile). Canada implements a class system for rating the performance of protectors. Gauger and Berger have reviewed the merits of several different rating methods and developed a rating system that is the basis of a new American National Standard, ANSI S12.68-2007

The various methods have slightly different interpretations, but each method has a percentile associated with the rating. That percent of the users should be able to achieve the rated attenuation. For instance, the NRR is determined by the mean attenuation minus two standard deviations. Thus, it translates to a 98% statistic. That is, at least 98 percent of users should be able to achieve that level of attenuation. The SNR and HML are a mean minus one standard deviation statistic. Therefore, approximately 86% of the users should be able to achieve that level of protection. Similarly, the NRR (SF) is a mean minus one standard deviation and represents an 86% of users should achieve that level of protection. The difference between the ratings lies in how the protectors are tested. NRR is tested with an experimenter-fit protocol. SNR/HML are tested with an experienced subject-fit protocol. NRR (SF) is tested with a naive subject-fit protocol. According to Murphy, et al. (2004), these three protocols will yield different amounts of attenuation with the NRR being the greatest and NRR (SF) being the least.

The experimenter-fit NRR should be adjusted per the guidelines of the National Institute for Occupational Safety and Health as the required NRR ratings differ greatly from lab tests to field tests.

The NRR(SF) used in Brazil, Australia, and New Zealand does not require derating as it resembles the manner in which the typical user will wear hearing protection.

==== Noise Reduction Rating (NRR) ====
Hearing protectors sold in the US are required by the EPA to have a noise reduction rating (NRR), which is an estimate of noise reduction at the ear when protectors are worn properly.

Real-ear attenuation at threshold (REAT) measurements are performed multiple times with 10 to 20 subjects to determine the NRR. Using the collected data, an average group attenuation is reported along with a standard deviation for attenuation on the hearing protector package.

Due to the discrepancy between how protectors are fit in the testing laboratory and how users wear protectors in the real world, the Occupational Safety and Health Administration (OSHA) and the National Institute for Occupational Safety and Health (NIOSH) have developed derating formulas to reduce the effective NRR.

While the NRR and the SNR (Single Number Rating) are designed to be used with C-weighted noise, which means that the lower frequencies are not de-emphasized, other ratings (NRR(SF) and NRSA) are determined for use with A-weighted noise levels, which have lower frequencies de-emphasized. NIOSH recommended and the U.S. EPA mandated that 7-dB compensation between C and A weighting be applied when the NRR is used with A-weighted noise levels.

The OSHA training manual for inspectors says the adequacy of hearing protection for use in a hazardous noise environment should be derated to account for how workers typically wear protection relative to how manufacturers test the protector's attenuation in the laboratory. For all types of hearing protection, OSHA's derating factor is 50%. If used with C-weighted noise, the derated NRR will become NRR/2. If used with A-weighted noise, OSHA applies the 7-dB adjustment for C-A weighting first then derates the remainder. For example, a protector with 33-dB attenuation would have this derating:

Derated NRR = (33 – 7)/2

NIOSH has proposed a different method for derating based upon the type of protector. For earmuffs, the NRR should be derated by 25%, for slow-recovery foam earplugs the derating is 50% for all other protection, the derating is 70%. NIOSH applies the C-A spectral compensation differently than OSHA. Where OSHA subtracts the 7-dB factor first and derates the result, NIOSH derates the NRR first and then compensates for the C-A difference. For example, to find the derated NRR for an earmuff by using the NIOSH derating system, the following equation would be used:

Derated NRR = (Original NRR x (1-.25)) – 7

Painful discomfort occurs at approximately 120 to 125 dB(A), with some references claiming 133 dB(A) for the threshold of pain. Active ear muffs are available with electronic noise cancellation that can reduce direct path ear canal noise by approximately 17–33 dB, depending on the low, medium, or high frequency at which attenuation is measured. Passive earplugs vary in their measured attenuation, ranging from 20 dB to 30 dB, depending on the fit of the earplugs, whether the employee can and knows how to insert the earplugs into the ear canal correctly, and whether they are used correctly and if low pass mechanical filters are also being used.

==== Double protection ====
The Canadian standard requires the use of two passive protective measures simultaneously at noise levels above 105 dBA. But the noise reduction does not increase very much. It is recommended to estimate the attenuation by adding 5 dB to the highest attenuation of one of the two HPDs. This recommendation does not take into account individual differences at all, and may lead to error.

Using both ear muffs (whether passive or active) and earplugs simultaneously results in maximum protection, but the efficacy of such combined protection relative to preventing permanent ear damage is inconclusive, with evidence indicating that a combined noise reduction ratio (NRR) of only 36 dB (C-weighted) is the maximum possible using ear muffs and earplugs simultaneously, equating to only a 36 - 7 = 29 dB(A) protection. Some high-end, passive, custom-molded earplugs also have a mechanical filter inserted into the center of the plug molded to the ear, with a small opening facing to the outside; this design permits being able to hear range commands at a gun range, for example, while still having full rating impulse noise protection.

Such custom molded earplugs with low pass filter and mechanical valve typically have a +85 dB(A) mechanical clamp, in addition to having a lowpass filter response, thereby providing typically 30-31 dB attenuation to loud impulse noises, with only a 21 dB reduction under low noise conditions across the human voice audible frequency range (300–4000 Hz) (thereby providing low attenuation between shots being fired), to permit hearing range commands. Similar functions are also available in standardized earplugs that are not custom molded.

==== Derating in several countries ====
Country, organization	Roll-down foam earplugs	Pre-molded earplugs	Earmuffs
USA, OSHA	2 times reduction	2 times	2 times
USA, NIOSH	2 times	3.3 times	1.33 times
Italy	2 times	3.3 times	1.33 times
UK	4 dB reduction	4 dB	4 dB
France	10 dB	10 dB	5-7 dB
Germany	9 dB	5 dB	5 dB

The wide variation in recommendations may be due in part to the very large inter-individual variability in results that cannot be predicted; but can be taken into account by individual measurements.

==== Expected updates ====
In 2007, the American National Standards Institute published a new standard for noise reduction ratings for hearing protectors, ANSI S12.68-2007. Using the real ear attenuation at threshold data collected by a laboratory test prescribed in ANSI S12.6-2008, the noise reduction statistic for A-weighted noise (NRSA) is computed using a set of 100 noises listed in the standard. The noise reduction rating, rather than be computed for a single noise spectrum the NRSA incorporates variability of both subject and spectral effects. ANSI S12.68 also defines a method to estimate the performance of a protector in an atypical noise environment.

Building upon work from the U.S. Air Force and the ISO 4869-2 standard, the protector's attenuation as a function of the difference in C and A-weighted noise level is used to predict typical performance in that noise environment. The derating may be quite severe (10 to 15 decibels) for protectors that have significant differences between low and high frequency attenuation. For "flat" attenuation protectors, the effect of C-A is less. This new system eliminates the need for calculators, relies on graphs and databases of empirical data, and is believed to be a more accurate system for determining NRRs.

=== Personal attenuation rating (PAR) ===
Similar to a noise reduction rating (NRR) required on hearing protection devices in the United States, a personal attenuation rating (PAR) can be obtained through a hearing protection fit-testing system. The PAR is subtracted from the measured noise exposure to estimate the total noise exposure an individual is receiving when wearing hearing protection. The PAR is regarded as more accurate than the NRR because it is calculated per individual and per hearing protection device, while NRR is a generalized estimate of potential sound reduction based on the protection provided to a small population of people.

In order to achieve significant attenuation, fit-testing and extensive personalized (one-on-one) training was found to be essential, whereas simple instructions did not lead to significant attenuation ove giving no instructions at all.

== Health risks ==
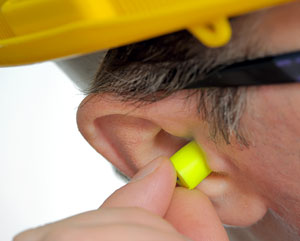
Earplugs are a form of hearing protection.

Earplugs are generally safe, but some precautions may be needed against a number of possible health risks, with additional ones appearing with long-term use:

- Pushing in earplugs into the external ear canal may cause the air pressure to rise in it, in effect pushing against the eardrum and causing pain. This may be caused by pressure on the ear while lying down on the side, and is also the case when completely expanded foam earplugs are pushed further into the ear. To bypass the latter risk, such earplugs are instead removed, compressed and inserted to the desired depth. Vice versa, when pulled out, the resultant negative pressure pulls the eardrum. Therefore, some earplugs are better carefully screwed or jiggled out rather than yanked out. Yawning does not help to equalize this air pressure difference, since it equalizes the pressures between the middle ear and the environment, while this overpressure rather is located in the outer ear, between the eardrum and the earplug.
- If pushed too far into the ear canal, they may push earwax and debris into the canal and possibly against the ear drum. As a precaution, earplugs should not be pushed further into the ear canal than they may be grabbed and rotated. Earwax impacted by earplugs can be removed by irrigation or other remedies, as described here.
- Hearing loss may occur due to earwax impacted by earplugs. But this should not be ignored by thinking only about earplugs. Serious conditions such as sudden sensorineural hearing loss (SSNHL) can also cause hearing loss, and this condition requires timely diagnosis and treatment. For this reason, people who experience symptoms of hearing loss should consult an ENT specialist.
- There is a possibility of allergic reactions, but this is likely rare, as earplugs generally are made of immunologically inert materials.

=== Long-term use ===
Custom shaped plugs are recommended for long-term use, since they are more comfortable and gentle to the skin and will not go too far into the ear canal.

Nevertheless, prolonged or frequently repeated use of earplugs has the following health risks, in addition to the short-term health risks:

- They may cause earwax to build up and plug the outer ear, since it blocks the normal flow of earwax outwards. This can result in tinnitus, hearing loss, discharge, pain or infection. Excess earwax should be carefully removed from the ear, and earplugs should be cleaned regularly with water and mild soap. However, foam type earplugs are usually designed to be disposable, and will expand and lose their memory property upon drying after washing with water and soap. From then on, they will expand very quickly after being compressed, making proper insertion into the ear canal quite problematic. They also lose a large proportion of sound attenuating capability after such washing and drying.
- They may cause irritation of the temporomandibular joint, which is located very close to the ear canal, causing pain. Individually fitted non-elastic earplugs may be less likely to cause this irritation compared with foam ones that expand inside the ear canal.
- Earplugs are also a possible cause of ear inflammation (otitis externa), although the short-term use of earplugs when swimming and shampooing hair may actually help prevent it. Still, many pathogenic bacteria grow well on warm, moist, foam-type plugs (polyvinylchloride (PVC) or polyurethane). However, there need also be a loss of integrity of the skin for infection to occur. Hard and poorly fitting earplugs can scratch the skin of the ear canal and set off an episode. When earplugs are used during an acute episode, disposable plugs are recommended, or used plugs must be cleaned and dried properly to avoid contaminating the healing ear canal with infected discharge.

== See also ==
- Hearing protection fit-testing
- Noise-induced hearing loss
- Occupational hearing loss
- Safe-in-Sound Award
