= Auditory fatigue =

Temporary or permanent loss of hearing due to exposure to sound

Auditory fatigue is defined as a temporary loss of hearing after exposure to sound. This results in a temporary shift of the auditory threshold known as a temporary hearing threshold shift (TTS). The damage can become permanent (permanent hearing threshold shift, PTS) if sufficient recovery time is not allowed before continued sound exposure. When the hearing loss is rooted from a traumatic occurrence, it may be classified as noise-induced hearing loss (NIHL).

There are two main types of auditory fatigue, short-term and long-term. These are distinguished from each other by several characteristics listed individually below.

Short-term fatigue

- Full recovery from TTS can be achieved in approximately two minutes.
- The TTS is relatively independent of exposure duration.
- TTS is maximal at the exposure frequency of the sound.

Long-term fatigue

- Recovery requires a minimum of several minutes but can take up to several days.
- Dependent on exposure duration and noise level.

== Physiology ==
=== Affected anatomy ===
Human ear anatomy: Brown is outer ear. Red is middle ear. Purple is inner ear.

Note: The complete anatomy of the human ear is extensive, and can be divided into the inner ear, middle ear and outer ear. The remainder of this article mainly references the cochlea, outer hair cells, and organ of Corti.

In general, structural damages to any anatomical part of the human ear can cause hearing-related problems. Usually, minor bending of the stereocilia of the inner ear is associated with temporary hearing loss and is involved in auditory fatigue. Complete loss of the stereocilia causes permanent hearing damage and is more associated with noise-induced hearing loss and other auditory diseases.

The outer hair cells, or OHCs, can be thought of as microamplifiers that provide stimulation to the inner hair cells. The OHCs are the most fragile of the hair cells, hence their involvement in auditory fatigue and other hearing impairments.

The hearing organ in fish is called an otolith, which is sensitive to particle motion, not sound pressure. Some fish also have a lateral line.

Location of anatomical parts
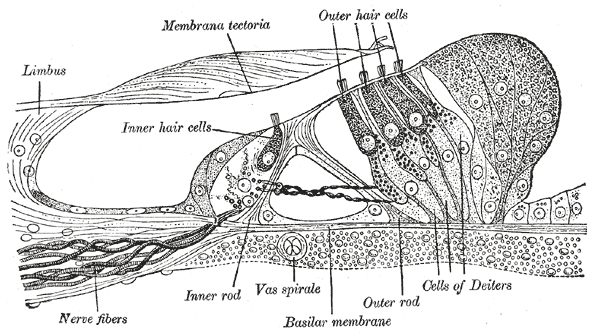
Inner ear showing cochlea	Cochlea showing organ of Corti	Organ of Corti showing hair cells

=== Affected mechanisms ===
==== Traveling wave theory ====
Temporary threshold shifts related to auditory fatigue are related to the amplitude of a stimulus-driven traveling wave. This is believed to be true because the vibration propagated by the active process is not usually at the center of the maximum amplitude of this wave. Instead, it is located much further down and the differences associated between them explain the shift in threshold. The TTS that is experienced is the exhaustion of the active system located at the locus of the traveling wave driven by the cochlear amplifier described below. Auditory fatigue can be explained by the relative activity of the active process at low-level stimulation (<30 dB).

===== Classical passive system =====
There are two different systems associated with the mechanics of the cochlea: the classical passive system and an active process. The passive system works to stimulate the inner hair cells directly and works at levels above 40 dB. At stimulation levels that prevent the excitation of the passive system, prolonged noise exposure results in a decrease in the loudness heard over time, even when the actual intensity of the noise has not changed. This is caused by the exhaustion of the active process.

===== Active process =====
The active process is also known as the cochlear amplifier. This amplification increases vibrations of the basilar membrane through energy obtained from the Organ of Corti. As the stimulation increases, it is assumed that basilar membrane displacement, caused by the traveling wave, becomes continually more basal in regards to the cochlea. A sustained low-level stimulus can cause an energetic exhaustion of the active system which in turn prevents the passive system from activating.

==== Excessive vibrations ====
Currently it is believed that auditory fatigue and NIHL are related to excessive vibrations of the inner ear which may cause structural damages. Metabolic activity is required in order to maintain the electrochemical gradients used in mechano-electrical and electro-mechanical transduction during noise exposure and sound recognition. The metabolic activity is associated with active displacements which are components of the sound-induced vibration involving prestin, a motor protein that causes OHC motility. Excess vibrations require increased metabolic energy.

In addition, these extra vibrations can cause the formation of free radicals known as reactive oxygen species or ROS. Elevated levels of ROS continue to increase the metabolic demands of the system. These increasing demands fatigue the system and eventually lead to structural damages to the Organ of Corti.

==== Recovery ====
In all cases of auditory fatigue, sufficient recovery time should allow full correction of the hearing impairment and return threshold levels to their baseline values. There is currently no way to estimate the amount of time needed to recover from auditory fatigue because it is not usually detectable until after the injury has already occurred. Studies that measured recovery time have noted that the time required is related to the magnitude of the initial hearing loss. The most significant recovery was found to occur during the first 15 minutes following cessation of the noise exposure. When sufficient recovery time is not allotted, the effects become permanent, resulting in acquired noise-induced hearing loss. Up to 120 minutes of recovery time can result from noises of 95 dB. For comparison, common items that can produce noise at this level are motorcycles and subways.

=== Protective measures ===
==== Toughening and energy spread ====
Two protective measures have been investigated related to the amount of noise exposure and the duration of that exposure. Although these would be hard to regulate in spontaneous occurrences, they could have a positive effect on work conditions if guidelines could be set for machining times or for other systems that produce loud noises over a long period of time. The toughening effect is put in place by increasing the system's resistance to noise over time. Currently, the specific mechanisms that cause the cochlear toughening are not known. However, the OHCs and related processes are known to play a role. The other toughening measure is to spread a given amount of energy to the system over a longer amount of time. This would allow recovery processes to take place during the quiet interludes that are gained by increasing the exposure duration. So far, studies have not shown a direct correlation between the amount of toughening and the amount of threshold shift experienced. This suggests that even a toughened cochlea may not be completely protected.

==== Substances ====
Both furosemide and salicylic acid are considered ototoxic at certain doses. Research has been done to determine their ability to protect against auditory fatigue and permanent damage through toughening phenomena, a state described by reduced active cochlear displacements. Although limited research has been done with these two substances in terms of protective drug regimes because of their associated risks, both have shown positive results in reducing auditory fatigue by the decrease in ROS formation through individual mechanisms described below.

===== Furosemide =====
Furosemide injections prior to noise exposure have been shown to decrease the endocochlear potential. This decrease results in a reduction of active cochlear displacements and it is believed that the protection by furosemide stems from the limitation of excessive vibrations while the cochlear amplifier is depressed.

===== Salicylic acid =====
Salicylic acid competitively interferes with anion binding to OHC prestin which thereby reduces motility. This reduction in active displacement is again associated with depression of the cochlear amplifier which decreases the excessive vibrations experienced during noise-exposure.

===== Antioxidants =====
Vitamins A, C and E have been shown to be 'free radical scavengers' by studies looking for protective tendencies of antioxidants. In addition, NAC, or N-acetyl-L-cysteine (acetylcysteine), has been shown to reduce ROS formation associated with the excessive vibrations induced by the noise exposure.

===== Limitations =====
Although auditory fatigue and NIHL protective measures would be helpful for those who are constantly exposed to long and loud noises, current research is limited due to the negative associations with the substances. Furosemide is used in congestive heart failure treatments because of its diuretic properties. Salicylic acid is a compound most frequently used in anti-acne washes, but is also an anticoagulant. Further uses of these substances would need to be personalized to the individual and only under close monitoring. Antioxidants do not have these negative effects and therefore are the most commonly researched substance for the purpose of protecting against auditory fatigue. However, at this time there has been no marketed application. In addition, no synergistic relationships between the drugs on the degree of reduction of auditory fatigue have been discovered at this time.

== Risk increasing factors ==
- Physical exercise
- Heat exposure
- Workload
- Ototoxic chemicals

There are several factors that may not be harmful to the auditory system by themselves, but when paired with an extended noise exposure duration have been shown to increase the risk of auditory fatigue. This is important because humans will remove themselves from a noisy environment if it passes their pain threshold. However, when paired with other factors that may not physically recognizable as damaging, TTS may be greater even with less noise exposure. One such factor is physical exercise. Although this is generally good for the body, combined noise exposure during highly physical activities was shown to produce a greater TTS than just the noise exposure alone. This could be related to the amount of ROS being produced by the excessive vibrations further increasing the metabolic activity required, which is already increased during physical exercise. However, a person can decrease their susceptibility to TTS by improving their cardiovascular fitness overall.

Heat exposure is another risk factor. As blood temperature rises, TTS increases when paired with high-frequency noise exposure. It is hypothesized that hair cells for high-frequency transduction require a greater oxygen supply than others, and the two simultaneous metabolic processes can deplete any oxygen reserves of the cochlea. In this case, the auditory system undergoes temporary changes caused by a decrease in the oxygen tension of the cochlear endolymph that leads to vasoconstriction of the local vessels. Further research could be done to see if this is a reason for the increased TTS during physical exercise that is during continued noise-exposure as well.

Another factor that may not show signs of being harmful is the current workload of a person. Exposure to noise greater than 95 dB in individuals with heavy workloads was shown to cause severe TTS. In addition, the workload was a driving factor in the amount of recovery time required to return threshold levels to their baselines.

There are some factors that are known to directly affect the auditory system. Contact with ototoxic chemicals such as styrene, toluene and carbon disulfide heighten the risk of auditory damages. Those individuals in work environments are more likely to experience the noise and chemical combination that can increase the likelihood of auditory fatigue. Individually, styrene is known to cause structural damages of the cochlea without actually interfering with functional capabilities. This explains the synergistic interaction between noise and styrene because the cochlea will be increasingly damaged with the excessive vibrations of the noise plus the damage caused by the chemical itself. Specifically, noise damage typically damages the first layer of the outer hair cells. The combined effects of styrene and noise exposure shows damages to all three rows instead, reinforcing previous results. Also, the combined effects of these chemicals and the noise produce greater auditory fatigue than when an individual is exposed to one factor immediately followed by the next.

It is important to understand that noise exposure itself is the main influential factor in threshold shifts and auditory fatigue, but that individuals may be at greater risk when synergistic effects take place during interactions with the above factors.

== Experimental studies ==
Studies have been carried out in humans, marine mammals (dolphins, harbour porpoises and harbour seals) rodents (mice, rats, guinea pigs and chinchillas) and fish.

== See also ==
- Hearing loss
- Hearing protection device
- Listener fatigue
- Noise-induced hearing loss
- Safe listening
- Tinnitus
