= Listener fatigue =

Phenomenon in response to auditory stimulus

Listener fatigue (also known as listening fatigue or ear fatigue) is a phenomenon that occurs after prolonged exposure to an auditory stimulus. Symptoms include tiredness, discomfort, pain, and loss of sensitivity. Listener fatigue is not a clinically recognized state, but is a term used by many professionals. The cause for listener fatigue is still not yet fully understood it is thought to be an extension of the quantifiable psychological perception of sound. Common groups at risk of becoming victim to this phenomenon include avid listeners of music and others who listen or work with loud noise on a constant basis, such as musicians, construction workers and military personnel.

== Causes ==
The exact causes of listener fatigue and the associated pathways and mechanisms are still being studied; some of the popular theories are presented below.

=== Introduction of artifacts in audio material ===
Musicality, especially on the radio, contains musical aspects (timbre, emotional impact, melody), and artifacts that arise from non-musical aspects (soundstaging, dynamic range compression, sonic balance). The introduction of these sonic artifacts affects the balance between these musical and non-musical aspects. When the volume of music is higher, these artifacts become more apparent, and because they are uncomfortable for the ear, cause listeners to "tune out" and lose focus or become tired. These listeners may then unconsciously avoid that type of music, or the radio station they may have heard it on.

=== Sensory overload ===
When exposed to a multitude of sounds from several different sources, sensory overload may occur. This overstimulation can result in general fatigue and loss of sensation in the ear. The associated mechanisms are explained in further detail down below. Sensory overload usually occurs with environmental stimuli and not noise induced by listening to music.

== Physiology ==
As with any type of hearing-related disorder, the related physiology is within the ear and central auditory system. With regards to listening fatigue, the relevant mechanical and biochemical mechanisms primarily deal with inner ear and cochlea.

=== Associated anatomy ===
The stereocilia (hair cells) of the inner ear can become subjected to bending from loud noises. Because they are not regeneratable in humans, any major damage or loss of these hair cells leads to permanent hearing impairment and other hearing-related diseases. Outer hair cells serve as acoustic amplifiers for stimulation of the inner hair cells. Outer hair cells respond primarily to low-intensity sounds.

Human ear anatomy: Brown is outer ear. Red is middle ear. Purple is inner ear.

=== Relevant mechanisms ===
==== Vibration ====
Excessive vibrations that occur in the inner ear can result in structural damage that will affect hearing. These vibrations result in an increase in the metabolic demands of the auditory system. During exposure to sound, metabolic energy is needed to maintain the relevant electrochemical gradients used in the transduction of sounds. The extra demands on the metabolic activity of the system can result in damage that can propagate throughout the ear.

==== Temporary threshold shifts ====
When exposed to noise, the human ear's sensitivity to sound is decreased, corresponding to an increase in the threshold of hearing. This shift is usually temporary but may become permanent. A natural physiological reaction to these threshold shifts is vasoconstriction, which will reduce the amount of blood reaching the hair cells of the organ of Corti in the cochlea. With the resultant oxygen tension and diminished blood supply reaching the outer hair cells, their response to sound levels is lessened when exposed to loud sounds, rendering them less effective and putting more stress on the inner hair cells. This can lead to fatigue and temporary hearing loss if the outer hair cells do not get the opportunity to recover through periods of silence. If these cells do not get this chance to recover, they are vulnerable to death.

Temporary threshold shifts can result in different types of fatigue.

===== Short-term fatigue =====
Recovery from temporary threshold shifts take a matter of minutes and shifts are essentially independent of the length of exposure to the sounds. Also, shifts are maximal during and at frequencies of exposure.

===== Long-term fatigue =====
Long-term fatigue is defined as full recovery from temporary threshold shifts taking at least several minutes to occur. Recovery can take up to several days. Threshold shifts that result in long-term fatigue are dependent on level of sound and length of exposure.

== Potential risk factors ==
=== Temperature and heat exposure ===
The temperature and heat levels of the body are directly correlated with the temporary threshold shifts of the ear. When the levels of blood temperature increase, these threshold shifts increase as well. The transduction of sounds requires an oxygen supply that will be readily depleted due to the prolonged threshold shifts.

=== Physical activity ===
When combining exercise with exposure to loud noises, humans have been observed to experience a long temporary threshold shift as well. Physical activity also results in an increase in metabolic activity, which has already been increased as a result of the vibrations of loud sounds. This factor is particularly interesting due to the fact that a large population of people listen to music while exercising.

=== Hearing Aids ===
People with hearing loss who do not use hearing aids consistently may be more likely to suffer listening fatigue. Without amplification, understanding speech and sound demands more effort and often inflicts stress on the listener.

== Experimental studies ==
=== Human ===
A study conducted in Japan reports fatigue sensation shown in subjects who listened to a metronome for six minutes. A metronome was used as part of a technique to test the effects of musical and rhythmic stimulation in physical rehabilitation programs. After a series of tests involving physical therapy exercises while songs with different tempos played, subjects were asked to evaluate their own levels of fatigue. The results showed no statistically significant difference between fatigue levels with and without listening to various music. However, many patients that did respond with fatigue after music recorded the highest level of fatigue possible on the evaluation scale. This experiment paves the way for further study in distinction of the perception of listening fatigue between individuals.

Lin et al., conducted an experiment in Taiwan that tested the effect of generation of reactive oxygen species on temporary threshold shift and noise-induced hearing loss. Subjects were employees at a steel manufacturing company and each one was assessed for personal noise exposure during work shifts. Statistical analysis yielded a correlation between exposure of higher-frequency sounds to lower temporary threshold shifts and greater levels of tiredness and hearing loss.

=== Animal ===
Studies have been done on a multiple animal species to help understand hearing loss and fatigue, including guinea pigs and dolphins., rats, fish, and chinchillas. These studies associate auditory fatigue with prolonged exposure to high levels of sound.

== Treatment and prevention ==
At first glance, it would seem that reducing the noise and volume would be sufficient to reduce or prevent listening fatigue altogether. However, it is evident that the issue is at least partly physiological in nature. In cases of sensory overload not related to purposeful listening of hazardous noises, common ear protection such as earplugs and earmuffs can help alleviate the issue.

== See also ==
- Auditory fatigue
- Loudness war
