= Cochlear amplifier =

Positive feedback mechanism within mammalian ears

The cochlear amplifier is a positive feedback mechanism within the cochlea that provides acute sensitivity in the mammalian auditory system. The main component of the cochlear amplifier is the outer hair cell (OHC) which increases the amplitude and frequency selectivity of sound vibrations using electromechanical feedback.

== Discovery ==
The cochlear amplifier was first proposed in 1948 by Thomas Gold. This was around the time when Georg von Békésy was publishing articles observing the propagation of passive travelling waves in the dead cochlea.

Thirty years later the first recordings of emissions from the ear were captured by Kemp. This was confirmation that such an active mechanism was present in the ear. These emissions are now termed otoacoustic emissions and are produced by the cochlear amplifier.

The first modeling effort to define the cochlear amplifier was a simple augmentation of Georg von Békésy's passive traveling wave with an active component. In such a model, a lopsided pressure about the organ of Corti is hypothesized which actively adds to the passive traveling wave to form the active traveling wave. An early example of such a model was defined by Neely and Kim. The existence of otoacoustic emissions is interpreted as implying backward as well as forward traveling waves generated in the cochlea, as proposed by Shera and Guinan.

Contention still surrounds the existence and mechanism of the active traveling wave. An experimental study in 2006 show that, emissions from the ear occur with such a fast response that the slowly propagating active traveling waves can not explain them. Their explanation for fast emission propagation is the dual of the active traveling wave, the active compression wave. Active compression waves were proposed as early as 1980 by Wilson due to older experimental data. An example model of the active compression wave (pressure wave) is defined by Flax and Holmes in 2011.

Other theories for the active processes in the inner ear exist.

== Function ==
=== Effect of sound waves on the cochlea ===
In the mammalian cochlea, wave amplification occurs via the outer hair cells (OHCs). These cells sit directly above the basilar membrane (BM), a structure highly sensitive to differences in frequency, and below the tectorial membrane (TM). When sound waves enter and travel through the scala vestibuli, they exert pressure on both BM and TM, which then vibrate in response to sound waves of different frequencies. When these membranes vibrate and are deflected upward (rarefaction phase of sound wave), the stereocilia of the OHCs are deflected toward the tallest stereocilia. This causes the tip links of the OHC hair bundle to open, allowing the inflow of Na^{+} and K^{+} ions, depolarizing the OHC. Upon depolarization, the OHC can then begin its process of amplification through force generated by the hair cell motors.

=== The somatic motor ===
The somatic motor is the OHC cell body and its ability to elongate or contract longitudinally due to changes in membrane potential. This function is aptly associated with the OHC structure within the organ of Corti. As seen through scanning electron micrograph imagery, the apical side of the OHC is mechanically coupled to the reticular lamina while the basal side of the OHC is coupled to the Deiter's cell cupula. Because the cell body is not in direct contact with any structure and is surrounded by the fluid-like perilymph, the OHC is considered dynamic and able to support electromotility.

Prestin is the transmembrane protein underlying the OHC's ability to elongate and contract, a process essential for OHC electromotility. This protein is voltage-sensitive. Contrary to previous research, prestin has also been shown to transport anions; the exact role of anion-transport in the somatic motor is still under investigation.

Under resting conditions, it is thought that chloride is bound to allosteric sites in prestin. Upon deflection of the basilar membrane (BM) upwards and subsequent deflection of the hair bundles toward the tallest stereocilia, channels within the stereocilia open allowing the inflow of ions and depolarizing the OHC results. Intracellular chloride dissociates from the allosteric binding sites in prestin, causing contraction of prestin. Upon BM deflection downwards hyperpolarization of the OHC results, and intracellular chloride ions bind allosterically causing prestin expansion. The binding or dissociation of chloride causes a shift in prestin's membrane capacitance. A nonlinear capacitance (NLC) results which leads to a voltage-induced mechanical displacement of prestin into an elongated or contracted state as described above. The larger the voltage nonlinearity, the larger prestin's response; this shows a concentration specific voltage-sensitivity of prestin.

Prestin densely lines the lipid bilayer of the outer hair cell membranes. Therefore, a change in the shape of many prestin proteins, which tend to conglomerate together, will ultimately lead to a change in shape of the OHC. A lengthening of prestin lengthens the hair cell while prestin contraction leads to a decrease in OHC length. Because the OHC is tightly associated with the reticular lamina and the Deiter's cell, shape change of the OHC leads to movement of these upper and lower membranes, causing changes in vibrations detected in the cochlear partition. Upon initial deflection of the BM causing positive hair bundle deflection, the reticular lamina is pushed downward, resulting in a negative deflection of the hair bundles. This causes stereocilia channel closing which leads to hyperpolarization and OHC elongation.

Below the hair bundle is an actin-rich cuticular plate. It has been hypothesized that the role of actin depolymerization is crucial for regulation of the cochlear amplifier. Upon actin polymerization, electromotile amplitude and OHC length increase. These changes in actin polymerization do not alter NLC, showing that actin's role in the cochlear amplifier is separate from that of prestin.

=== The hair bundle motor ===
The hair bundle motor is the force generated from a mechanical stimulus. This is done through the use of the mechanoelectrical transduction (MET) channel, which allows for the passage of Na^{+}, K^{+}, and Ca^{2+}. The hair bundle motor operates by deflecting hair bundles in the positive direction and providing positive feedback of the basilar membrane, increasing the movement of the basilar membrane which increases the response to a signal. Two mechanisms have been proposed for this motor: fast adaptation, or channel re-closure, and slow adaptation.

==== Fast adaptation ====
This model relies upon a calcium gradient generated by the opening and closing of the MET channel. Positive deflection of the tip links stretches them in the direction of the tallest stereocilia, causing MET channel opening. This allows the passage of Na^{+}, K^{+}, and Ca^{2+}. Additionally, Ca^{2+} briefly binds to a cytosolic site on the MET channel which is estimated to be only 5 nm from the channel pore. Because of close proximity to the channel opening, it is suspected that Ca^{2+} binding affinity can be relatively low. When calcium binds to this site, the MET channels begin to close. Channel closure ceases the transduction current and increases the tension in the tip links, forcing them back in the negative direction of the stimulus. Binding of calcium is short-lived, because the MET channel must participate in additional cycles of amplification. When calcium dissociates from the binding site, calcium levels fall rapidly. Due to the differences in calcium concentration at the cytosolic binding site when calcium is bound to the MET channel versus when calcium dissociates, a calcium gradient is created, generating chemical energy. The oscillation of calcium concentration and force generation contributes to amplification. The timecourse of this mechanism is on the order of hundreds of microseconds, which reflects the speed that is necessary for amplification of high frequencies.

==== Slow adaptation ====
As opposed to the fast adaptation model, slow adaptation relies on the myosin motor to alter the stiffness of the tip links leading to alterations of channel current. First, the stereocilia are deflected in the positive direction opening the MET channels and allowing for inflow of Na^{+}, K^{+}, and Ca^{2+}. The entering current first increases and then quickly decreases due to myosin's release of tension of the tip link and subsequent closing of channels. It is hypothesized that the tip link is attached to the myosin motor which moves along actin filaments. Again the polymerization of actin could play a crucial role in this mechanism, as it does in OHC electromotility.

Calcium has also been shown to play a crucial role in this mechanism. Experiments have shown that in reduced extracellular calcium, the myosin motor tightens, resulting in more open channels. Then, when additional channels are opened, the inflow of calcium acts to relax the myosin motor, which returns the tip links to their resting state, causing channels to close. This is hypothesized to occur via the binding of calcium to the myosin motor. The timecourse of this event is 10-20 milliseconds. This time scale reflects the time that is needed to amplify low frequencies. Although the largest contributor to slow adaptation is the tension-dependence, calcium-dependence acts as a useful feedback mechanism.

This mechanism of myosin's reaction to hair bundle deflection imparts sensitivity to small changes in hair bundle position.

=== Integration of electromotility and hair bundle dynamics ===
Electromotility of the OHC by prestin modulation produces significantly larger forces than the forces generated by deflection of the hair bundle. One experiment showed that the somatic motor produced a 40-fold greater force at the apical membrane and a sixfold greater force at the basilar membrane than the hair bundle motor. The difference in these two motors is that there are different polarities of hair bundle deflection for each motor. The hair bundle motor uses a positive deflection leading to a generation of force, while the somatic motor uses negative deflection to generate force. However, both the somatic motor and the hair bundle motor produce significant displacements of the basilar membrane. This, in turn, leads to augmentation of bundle movement and signal amplification.

The mechanical force that is generated by these mechanisms increases the movement of the basilar membrane. This, in turn, influences the deflection of the hair bundles of the inner hair cells. These cells are in contact with afferent fibers that are responsible for transmitting signals to the brain.
