= Evolution of the cochlea =

Cochlea /ˈkoʊkliə/ is Latin for “snail, shell or screw” and originates from the Greek word κοχλίας kokhlias. The modern definition, the auditory portion of the inner ear, originated in the late 17th century. Within the mammalian cochlea exists the organ of Corti, which contains hair cells that are responsible for translating the vibrations it receives from surrounding fluid-filled ducts into electrical impulses that are sent to the brain to process sound.

This spiral-shaped cochlea is estimated to have originated during the early Cretaceous Period, around 120 million years ago. Further, the auditory innervation of the spiral-shaped cochlea also traces back to the Cretaceous period. The evolution of the human cochlea is a major area of scientific interest because of its favourable representation in the fossil record. During the last century, many scientists such as evolutionary biologists and paleontologists strove to develop new methods and techniques to overcome the many obstacles associated with working with ancient, delicate artifacts.

In the past, scientists were limited in their ability to fully examine specimens without causing damage to them. In more recent times, technologies such as micro-CT scanning became available. These technologies allow for the visual differentiation between fossilized animal materials and other sedimentary remains. With the use of X-ray technologies, it is possible to ascertain some information about the auditory capabilities of extinct creatures, giving insight to human ancestors as well as their contemporary species.

== Comparative anatomy ==
While the basic structure of the inner ear in lepidosaurs (lizards and snakes), archosaurs (birds and crocodilians) and mammals is similar, and the organs are considered to be homologous, each group has a unique type of auditory organ. The hearing organ arose within the lagenar duct of stem reptiles, lying between the saccular and lagenar epithelia. In lepidosaurs, the hearing organ, the basilar papilla, is generally small, with at most 2000 hair cells, whereas in archosaurs the basilar papilla can be much longer (>10mm in owls) and contain many more hair cells that show two typical size extremes, the short and the tall hair cells. In mammals, the structure is known as the organ of Corti and shows a unique arrangement of hair cells and supporting cells. All mammalian organs of Corti contain a supporting tunnel made up of pillar cells, on the inner side of which there are inner hair cells and outer hair cells on the outer side. The definitive mammalian middle ear and the elongated cochlea allows for better sensitivity for higher frequencies.

=== Lepidosaurs ===
As in all lepidosaurs and archosaurs, the single-ossicle (columellar) middle ear transmits sound to the footplate of the columella, which sends a pressure wave through the inner ear. In snakes, the basilar papilla is roughly 1mm long and only responds to frequencies below about 1 kHz. In contrast, lizards tend to have two areas of hair cells, one responding below and the other above 1 kHz. The upper frequency limit in most lizards is roughly 5–8 kHz. The longest lizard papillae are about 2mm long and contain 2000 hair cells and their afferent innervating fibers can be very sharply tuned to frequency.

=== Archosaurs ===
In birds and crocodilians, the similarity of the structure of the basilar papilla betrays their close evolutionary relationship. The basilar papilla is up to about 10mm long and contains up to 16,500 hair cells. While most birds have an upper hearing limit of only about 6 kHz, the barn owl can hear up to 12 kHz and thus close to the human upper limit.

=== Mammals ===
Egg-laying mammals, the monotremes (echidna and platypus), do not have a spiral cochlea, but one shaped more like a banana, up to about 7 mm long. Like in lepidosaurs and archosaurs, it contains a lagena, a vestibular sensory epithelium, at its tip. Only in therian mammals (marsupials and placentals) is the cochlea truly coiled 1.5 to 3.5 times. Whereas in monotremes there are many rows of both inner and outer hair cells in the organ of Corti, in therian (marsupial and placental) mammals the number of inner hair-cell rows is one, and there are generally only three rows of outer hair cells.

=== Amphibians ===
Amphibians have unique inner ear structures. There are two sensory papillae involved in hearing, the basilar (higher frequency) and amphibian (lower frequency) papillae, but it is uncertain whether either is homologous to the hearing organs of lepidosaurs, archosaurs and mammals and it is uncertain when they arose.

=== Fish ===
Fish have no dedicated auditory epithelium, but use various vestibular sensory organs that respond to sound. In most teleost fishes it is the saccular macula that responds to sound. In some, such as goldfishes, there is also a special bony connection to the gas bladder that increases sensitivity allowing hearing up to about 4 kHz.

=== Neanderthals to modern humans ===
The size of cochlea has been measured throughout its evolution based on the fossil record. In one study, the basal turn of the cochlea was measured, and it was hypothesized that cochlear size correlates with body mass. The size of the basal turn of the cochlea was not different in Neanderthals and Holocene humans, however it became larger in early modern humans and Upper Paleolithic humans. Furthermore, the position and orientation of the cochlea is similar between Neanderthals and Holocene humans, relative to plane of the lateral canal, whereas early modern and upper Paleolithic humans have a more superiorly placed cochlea than Holocene humans. When comparing hominins of the Middle Pleistocene, Neanderthals and Holocene humans, the apex of the cochlea faces more inferiorly in the hominins than the latter two groups. Finally, the cochlea of European middle Pleistocene hominins faces more inferiorly than Neanderthals, modern humans, and Homo erectus.

Human beings, along with apes, are the only mammals that do not have high frequency (>32 kHz) hearing. Humans have long cochleae, but the space devoted to each frequency range is quite large (2.5mm per octave), resulting in a comparatively reduced upper frequency limit. The human cochlea has approximately 2.5 turns around the modiolus (the axis). Humans, like many mammals and birds, are able to perceive auditory signals that displace the eardrum by a mere picometre.

== The ear ==
Because of its prominence and preserved state in the fossil record, until recently, the ear had been used to determine phylogeny. The ear itself contains different portions, including the outer ear, the middle ear, and the inner ear and all of these show evolutionary changes that are often unique to each lineage. It was the independent evolution of a tympanic middle ear in the Triassic period that produced strong selection pressures towards improved hearing organs in the separate lineages of land vertebrates.

=== Evolutionary perspective ===
The cochlea is the tri-chambered auditory detection portion of the ear, consisting of the scala media, the scala tympani, and the scala vestibuli. Regarding mammals, placental and marsupial cochleae have similar cochlear responses to auditory stimulation as well as DC resting potentials. This leads to the investigation of the relationship between these therian mammals and researching their ancestral species to trace the origin of the cochlea.

This spiral-shaped cochlea that is in both marsupial and placental mammals is traced back to approximately 120 million years ago. The development of the most basic basilar papilla (the auditory organ that later evolved into the Organ of Corti in mammals) happened at the same time as the water-to-land transition of vertebrates, approximately 380 million years ago. The actual coiling or spiral nature of the cochlea occurred to save space inside the skull. The longer the cochlea, the higher is the potential resolution of sound frequencies given the same hearing range. The oldest of the truly coiled mammalian cochleae were approximately 4 mm in length.

The earliest evidence available for primates depicts a short cochlea with prominent laminae, suggesting that they had good high-frequency sensitivity as opposed to low-frequency sensitivity. After this, over a period of around 60 million years, evidence suggests that primates developed longer cochleae and less prominent laminae, which means that they had an improvement in low-frequency sensitivity and a decrease in high-frequency sensitivity. By the early Miocene period, the cycle of the elongation of the cochleae and the deterioration of the laminae was completed. Evidence shows that primates have had an increasing cochlear volume to body mass ratio over time. These changes in the cochlear labyrinth volume negatively affect the highest and lowest audible frequencies, causing a downward shift. Non-primates appear to have smaller cochlear labyrinth volumes overall when compared to primates. Some evidence also suggests that selective forces for the larger cochlear labyrinth may have started after the basal primate node.

Mammals are the subject of a substantial amount of research not only because of the potential knowledge to be gained regarding humans, but also because of their rich and abundant representation in the fossil record. The spiral shape of the cochlea evolved later on in the evolutionary pathway of mammals than previously believed, just before the therians split into the two lineages marsupials and placentals, about 120 million years ago.

=== The evolution of prestin ===
Parallel to the evolution of the cochlea, prestin shows an increased rate of evolution in therian mammals. Prestin is the motor protein of the outer hair cells of the inner ear of the mammalian cochlea. It is found in the hair cells of all vertebrates, including fish, but are thought to have initially been membrane transporter molecules. A high concentration of prestin are found only in the lateral membranes of therian outer hair cells (there is uncertainty with regard to concentrations in monotremes). This high concentration is not found in inner hair cells, and is also lacking in all hair cell types of non-mammals.

Prestin also has a role in motility, which evolved a greater importance in the motor function in land vertebrates, but this developed vastly differently in different lineages. In certain birds and mammals, prestin function as both transporters and motors, but the strongest evolution to robust motor dynamics only evolved in therian mammals. It is hypothesized that this motor system is significant to the therian cochlea at high frequencies because of the distinctive cellular and bony composition of the organ of Corti that allows prestin to intensify the movements of the whole structure.

Modern ultra-sound echolocating species such as bats and toothed whales show highly evolved prestin, and this prestin shows identical sequence alterations over time. Unusually, the sequences thus apparently evolved independent from each other during different time periods. Furthermore, the evolution of neurotransmitter receptor systems (acetylcholine) that regulate the motor feedback of the outer hair cells coincides with prestin evolution in therians. This suggests that there was a parallel evolution of a control system and a motor system in the inner ear of therian mammals.

=== Homoplasies (convergent evolution) ===
Land vertebrates evolved middle ears independently in each major lineage, and are thus the result of parallel evolution. The configurations of the middle ears of monotreme and therian mammals can thus be interpreted as convergent evolution or homoplasy. Thus evidence from fossils demonstrate homoplasies for the detachment of the ear from the jaw. Furthermore, it is apparent that the land-based eardrum, or tympanic membrane, and connecting structures such as the Eustachian tube evolved convergently in multiple different settings as opposed to being a defining morphology.
