= Universal neonatal hearing screening =

Policy of routinely testing the hearing of babies soon after birth

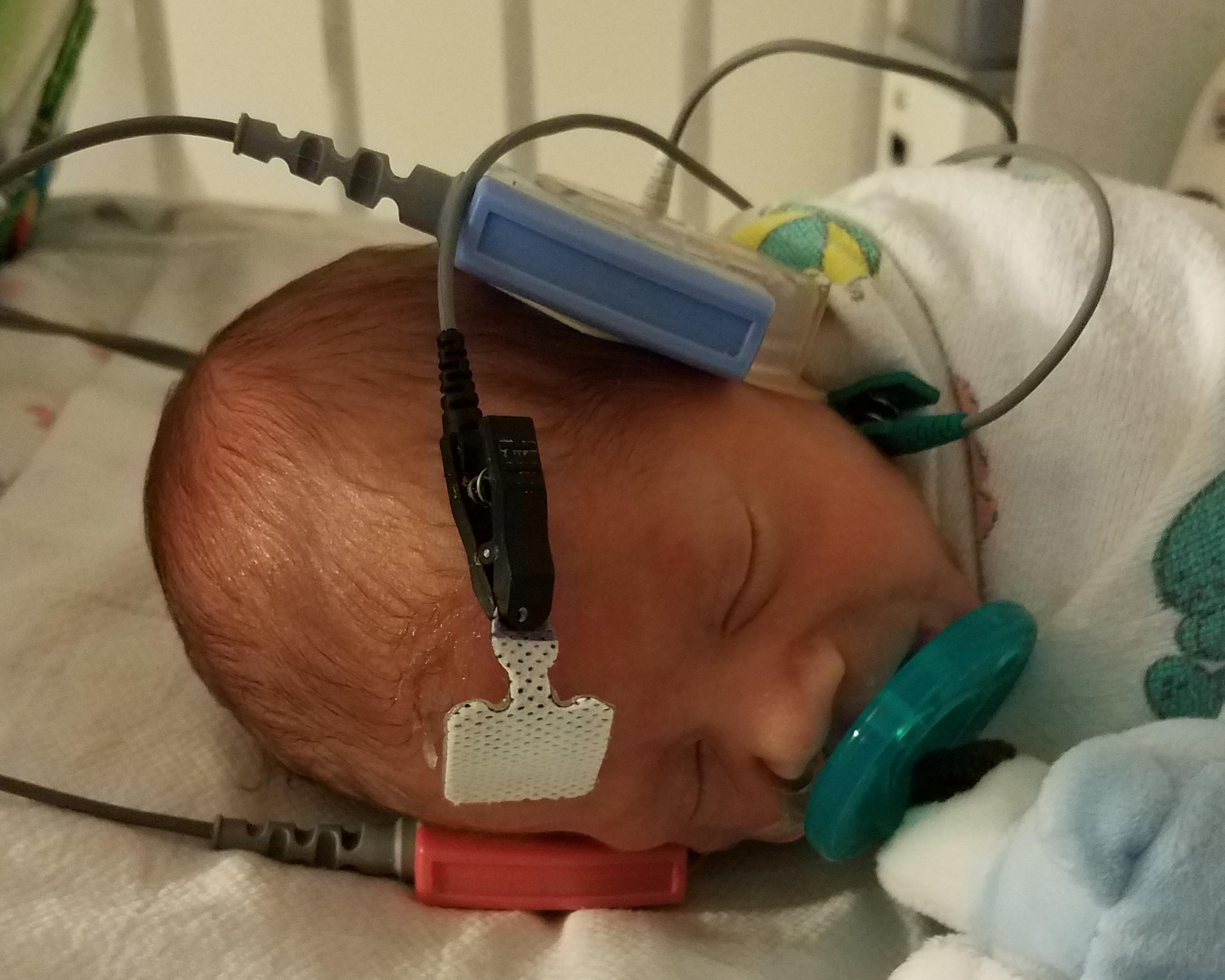
- A newborn infant undergoes a hearing screening.
- Purpose: early intervention/identification of deaf or hard-of-hearing infants

Universal neonatal hearing screening (UNHS), which is part of early hearing detection and intervention (EHDI) programmes, refer to those services aimed at screening hearing of all newborns, regardless of the presence of a risk factor for hearing loss. UNHS is the first step in the EHDI program which indicates whether a newborn requires further audiological assessment to determine the presence or absence of permanent hearing loss. Newborn hearing screening uses objective testing methods (usually otoacoustic emission (OAE) testing or automated auditory brainstem response (ABR) testing) to screen the hearing of all newborns in a particular target region, regardless of the presence or absence of risk factors. Even among developed countries, until the 1990s, it could take years for hearing-impaired child to be diagnosed and to benefit from a health intervention and amplification. This delay still can happen in developing countries. If children are not exposed to sounds and language during their first years of life because of a hearing loss, they will have difficulty in developing spoken or signed language; cognitive development and social skills could also be affected. This screening separates children into two groups—those with a high index of suspicion (more likely to have permanent congenital hearing loss) and those with a low index of suspicion (less likely to have permanent congenital hearing loss). Those in the first group are referred for diagnostic testing.

Newborn hearing screening has been implemented in many regions worldwide since the early 2000s as it aims to reduce the age of detection for hearing loss—meaning that diagnosed children can receive early intervention, which is more effective because the brain's ability to learn language (spoken, cued, or signed) reduces as the child ages. Children born with permanent congenital hearing loss have historically performed worse educationally, had poorer language acquisition, social functioning and vocational choices than their hearing peers.

== Overview ==
In order to be most effective in minimizing developmental delays and promoting communication, education and social development, timely and appropriate interventions need to follow the early identification of hearing loss. Interventions for children with permanent congenital hearing loss ranges from devices that amplify sound to devices that replace the function of a damaged inner ear to communication modalities including spoken language, sign language, and cued speech. The choice of interventions depends on the degree and the cause of hearing loss, accessibility, affordability and family choice. For interventions to be effective, they should be appropriate, timely, family-centered and undertaken through a coordinated interdisciplinary approach, which includes access to specialists who have the professional qualifications and specialized knowledge and skills to support and promote optimal development outcomes. Key elements for ensuring the best outcomes for children with hearing loss may include:

- hearing devices, such as hearing aids, and middle ear or cochlear implants;
- hearing assistive technology, such as FM/radio systems and loop systems;
- therapy to develop spoken language, such as auditory-verbal therapy, cued speech and auditory-oral therapy;
- development of nonverbal communication, such as sign language (see also American Sign Language).

EHDI programmes exist in many countries, including the United States, United Kingdom, Australia, New Zealand, and the majority of countries making up the European Union. In order to maximize language and communication competence, literacy development, and psychosocial well-being, the U.S. Joint Committee on Infant Hearing endorses the goals that 1) all newborns should undergo hearing screening using physiologic measures prior to hospital discharge, but no later than one month of age 2) all infants whose do not pass screening should have appropriate audiologic diagnosis no later than three months of age and 3) all infants identified as deaf or hard of hearing in one or both ears should be referred to early targeted and appropriate intervention services as soon as possible after diagnosis, but no later than six months of age. Newborn hearing screening employs objective assessment methods, either with automated (ABR) or (OAE), or both for initial and/or rescreening procedures.

=== Rates of congenital hearing loss ===
Hearing loss in neonates is the most common congenital birth defect and sensory disorder, and can be caused by a variety of reasons. Research has placed the prevalence of significant permanent hearing loss in neonates at 1–2 per 1000 live births in the United States. With this screening, many forms of congenital hearing loss can be detected. Congenital hearing loss can be due to genetic causes, environmental exposures during pregnancy, or health complications shortly after birth. Population-based studies in Europe and North America have identified a consistent prevalence of approximately 0.1% of children having a hearing loss of more than 40 decibels through review of health or education records, or both. Other international studies using different methods or criteria have reported higher estimates. In the United States, studies have shown a wide range of estimates for the number of children with hearing loss depending upon the reported age range, type, degree, frequency, laterality and method of ascertainment (e.g. audiometric testing, parental report, record review). Audiometric data of adolescents aged 12 to 19 years obtained through the National Health and Nutrition Examination Survey (NHANES) identified 3% to 5% of adolescents with hearing loss of 25 decibels or more and 15% to 20% with hearing losses of greater than 15 decibels.

=== Research studies ===
Studies have found that early diagnosis and intervention for children with hearing loss can help them develop better communication skills. Researchers have shown children with hearing loss meeting the current early identification and intervention guidelines were more likely to have enhanced vocabulary than children who did not meet EHDI 1-3-6 guidelines. Funded research projects have focused on improving EHDI process issues including improving LFU/LTD rates through at Women, Infants, and Children (WIC) certification screening visits. and exploring technologies that can be incorporated in electrophysiological testing to facilitate hearing loss diagnosis in newborns, without the use of sedation.

Investigators have reported on numerous topics including the screening and diagnostic evaluations of children with unilateral and mild bilateral hearing loss, the impact of hearing loss and comorbidities, and the long-term hearing loss risk of children born with cytomegalovirus.

== Screening methodology ==
Often a two-stage process occurs in the actual screening of the hearing. Children are screened with either otoacoustic emissions (OAE) or automated auditory brainstem response (AABR). Children passing the test receive no further assessment. Children who fail the initial screen are usually referred for a second screening assessment either with OAE's or AABR. Children failing this second assessment will usually be sent for diagnostic assessment of their hearing. There is some variation in procedure by region and country but most follow this basic principle.

Screening personnel vary also, in some regions Audiologists are used, whereas technicians, nurses, or volunteers are used in other programs. In countries that have insufficient financial and human resources to implement hearing screening, community-based programs have used simple, behaviour-based questionnaires to identify infants with hearing loss but with limited success.

=== Targeted hearing screening ===
Targeted neonatal hearing screening describes the process by which only a specific subset of a population are screened (for instance those infants in the neonatal intensive care unit or with risk factors for hearing loss). Although the U.S. Joint Committee on Infant Hearing (JCIH) endorsed the goal of universal detection of infants with hearing loss in 1994, it modified and maintained a role for specific high risk factors described in their previous (1973, 1982 and 1990) position statements.

== Successes ==
Universal newborn hearing screening programs aim to have high coverage rates (participation) and many aim to screen babies by one month of age, aim to complete the diagnostic process for referred babies by three months of age, and aim to begin intervention services by six months of age.

U.S. jurisdictional programs (states and territories) screened less than 3% of all newborns for hearing loss in the U.S. at the beginning of the 1990s. Data from states and territories for the early years of EHDI (1999–2004) were collected using surveys conducted by the Directors of Speech and Hearing Programs in State Health and Welfare Agencies and shared with the CDC EHDI Program. Beginning in 2005, CDC obtained data through an Office of Management and Budget approved survey sent to EHDI programme directors. In 1999, 22 jurisdictions estimated that less than half of all infants (46.5%) were screened for hearing loss, steadily increasing to 80.1% in 2005 85.4% in 2007, and 98.0% by 2009. The number of deaf and hard of hearing babies identified early in life in the U.S. has steadily increased from 855 in the year 2000, 2,634 in 2005 and most recently reported 6,337 in calendar year 2016.

== Challenges ==
In addition to meeting the "1-3-6" targets, one of the key challenges for newborn hearing screening programmes is to reduce 'loss to follow-up' (where a child does not return for the next stage of the process). The Joint Committee on Infant Hearing (US) has reported that this is a significant problem in state screening programmes in the United States and other jurisdictions. Measuring loss to follow-up is an important step in understanding and reducing it.

Now that over 95% of U.S. infants are having their hearing screened, remaining challenges include ensuring timely diagnostic evaluation for those who do not pass the screening and enrollment in early intervention for those with diagnosed hearing loss. In 2005, >60% of infants who had not passed the final or most recent screening were lost-to-follow-up/lost to documentation (LFU/LTD). Some of those infants may have received audiologic evaluations, but the results not reported to the EHDI programme (i.e., undocumented evaluation). By 2007, LFU/LTD among infants not passing the final or most recent screening had decreased to approximately 46% and to 35% in 2011. The LFU/LTD percent for diagnosis in 2016 was 25.4% (n = 16,522). The 2016 LFU/LTD percent for enrollment in early intervention was 19.6% (n = 1,239).

Challenges to newborn hearing screening have existed for over three decades. Newborn screening alone can miss postnatal, progressive or acquired hearing loss, there is poor identification of perinatal infections, and concerns over regulatory barriers and privacy continue to this day. Many infants are lost to follow-up and many families face the challenge of navigating coordinated quality care through complex health to education systems involving multiple agencies.

== History ==
In 1956, Erik Wedenberg published one of the earliest articles describing examiner use of tuning forks, percussion sounds, pitch pipes, and cowbells to screen the hearing newborn infants. The author noted, "until recently it has not been considered possible to carry out reliable auditory tests until the child has attained the age of 6–7 years."

In 1963, Marion Downs, affectionately referred to as the "mother of pediatric audiology", pioneered the first hospital based infant hearing screening programme in Denver, Colorado, using Behavioral Observation Audiometry (BOA). Several independent observers recorded eye-blink and/or startle responses after presentation of narrow-band (90 dB) and white noise (93 dB) stimulation. In her 1964 publication, the observers identified suspected hearing losses, although disagreements were significant for 26% of the infants. In 1969, Marion led efforts for the formation of the Joint Committee on Infant Hearing (JCIH) to provide multi-disciplinary leadership and guidance in all areas of newborn and infant hearing issues.

In their 1971 Position Statement, the JCIH determined the results of screening programs were inconsistent and misleading and, although recognizing the urgent need for early detection, recommended discontinuing routine behavioral hearing screening of newborn infants. In 1973 the Committee recommended that only infants with certain high risk factors have their hearing evaluated (five factors: family history; congenital perinatal infections; ear, nose or throat defects; low birthweight <1500 g; hyperbilirubinemia).

In 1982, two additional risk factors were added (bacterial meningitis and birth asphyxia including low Apgar scores) and included the recommendation for BOA or physiologic screening of high-risk infants. At that time, the Committee did not recommend any specific device, although many programme were successfully utilizing automated ABR for newborn screening. Despite efforts and endorsements, the growth of high-risk screening in the United States was very slow. In 1984, high-risk hearing registries only included an estimated 15 percent of the nation's newborn population and likely, that less than half of those infants had their hearing assessed. Other weaknesses identified that a restricted risk register will excludes approximately 50 percent of infants with hearing impairment.

In 1989 Surgeon General C. Everett Koop, perhaps most remembered for his work related to abortion, tobacco, and AIDS, called for increased efforts to identify congenital hearing loss within the first year of life. In his words, "It's a tall order, yes, but if we all work together, I believe we can fill it."

In 1990, the JCIH added three more risk factors (ototoxic medication, prolonged mechanical ventilation, syndromic stigmata) for a total of ten. Congressman James T. Walsh (R-NY) sponsored and introduced the first attempt at federal legislation with the Hearing Loss Testing Act of 1991 requiring the hearing testing of every child born in the United States at the time of birth and establishing uniform standards for such testing. Although the Committee on Energy and Commerce referred this legislation to subcommittee, Congressman Walsh continued to promote legislation throughout that decade as the co-founder and co-chair of the Congressional Hearing Health Caucus. In 1993, the National Institutes of Health Consensus statement initiated the concept of "1-3-6" as the monthly milestones for screening, diagnosis and intervention. Between 1993 and 1996, the National Center for Hearing Assessment and Management at Utah State University conducted the Rhode Island Hearing Assessment Project (RIHAP), which demonstrated the feasibility of using transient OAEs for universal screening. In 1994, both the JCIH and the DSHPSHWA endorsed universal newborn hearing screening. In 1996, the US Preventive Services Task Force concluded that the evidence was insufficient to assess the balance of benefits and harms and assigned an "I Statement" grade for newborn hearing screening.

All US states participate in Early Hearing Detection and Intervention (EHDI) programmes. The birth of EHDI may be attributed to passage of the Children's Health Act of 2000 which included language from Walsh's proposed legislation and authorized the Secretary of the Department of Health and Human Services, acting through the Centers for Disease Control and Prevention and the Health Resources and Services Administration, to establish "statewide newborn and infant hearing screening evaluation and intervention programs and systems." Congress provided HRSA with the authority to support statewide services and the CDC with the authority to provide technical assistance for data management and applied research. In addition, the National Institute on Deafness and Other Communication Disorders at NIH provided the authority to continue a programme of research and development on the efficacy of new screening techniques and technology.

The year 2000 Position Statement of the JCIH provided the Principles and Guidelines for Early Hearing Detection and Intervention Programs. In 2006, the HHS Secretary's Advisory Committee on Heritable Disorders in Newborns and Children (SACHDNC) included newborn hearing as one of the conditions to be included in their Recommended Uniform Screening Panel (RUSP). With growing research evidence, in 2007 United States Preventive Services Task Force (USPSTF) recommended screening of hearing loss in all newborn infants with an assigned B grade. By 2010, 43 states enacted legislative statutes or written regulatory language related to universal newborn hearing screening.

The electronic age of EHDI may have begun during the next decade. The Quality, Research, and Public Health (QRPH) Planning and Technical Committees of Integrating the Healthcare Enterprise published a series of EHDI technical documents. These profiles promote the automated collection and communication exchange of EHDI data between clinical and public health information systems (results, demographics, care plans, quality measures). The U.S. National Library of Medicine maintains the Newborn Screening Coding and Terminology Guide to promote and facilitate the use of electronic health data standards in recording and transmitting newborn screening test results. This includes EHDI standard vocabulary codes and terminologies, including Logical Observation Identifiers Names and Codes (LOINC), Systematized Nomenclature of Medicine — Clinical Terms (SNOMED CT). The National Quality Forum the Centers for Medicare & Medicaid Services, and the Joint Commission for hospital accreditation have endorsed and/or supported adoption of EHDI electronic quality measures. EHDI-PALS (Pediatric Audiology Links to Services) provides web-based link to information, resources, and services for children with hearing loss. In 2018, Health Level 7 (HL7) approved the Early Hearing Detection and Intervention (EHDI) Implementation Guide as a Normative Standard.

== Situation worldwide ==
In 2014 to 2019 the International Newborn and Infant Hearing Screening (NIHS) Group asked via questionnaire for the status of the hearing screening in 196 states worldwide; data from 158 states were obtained: in 64 states there is no or less screening (38% of the world's population); in 41 states (38% of the world's population) >85% of the babies are screened. The mean living standard in these states was 10 times higher than in countries without screening. It could show how useful a hearing screening can be: average age at diagnosis of hearing disorders was 4.6 months for screened children and 34.9 months for non-screened children.
