= Georg von Békésy =

Hungarian-American biophysicist (1899–1972)

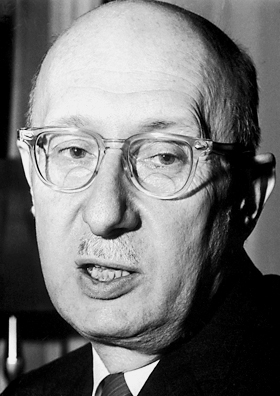
- Békésy in 1961
- Born: György Békésy; 3 June 1899; Budapest, Austria-Hungary
- Died: 13 June 1972 (aged 73); Honolulu, Hawaii, U.S.
- Citizenship: U.S.
- Education: University of Bern
- Known for: Cochlea
- Parents: Sándor Békésy (father); Paula Mazaly (mother)
- Awards: Nobel Prize in Physiology or Medicine (1961); ASA Gold Medal (1961)
- Scientific career
- Fields: Biophysics

Georg von Békésy (Hungarian: Békésy György, pronounced [ˈbeːkeːʃi ˈɟørɟ]; 3 June 1899 – 13 June 1972) was a Hungarian-American biophysicist.

By using strobe photography and silver flakes as a marker, he was able to observe that the basilar membrane moves like a surface wave when stimulated by sound. Because of the structure of the cochlea and the basilar membrane, different frequencies of sound cause the maximum amplitudes of the waves to occur at different places on the basilar membrane along the coil of the cochlea. High frequencies cause more vibration at the base of the cochlea while low frequencies create more vibration at the apex.

He concluded that his observations showed how different sound wave frequencies are locally dispersed before exciting different nerve fibers that lead from the cochlea to the brain.

In 1961, he was awarded the Nobel Prize in Physiology or Medicine for his research on the function of the cochlea in the mammalian hearing organ.

In his last publication A. James Hudspeth and his research team – based on "a groundbreaking technological advancement" – ultimately established that also in mammals frequency analysis in the inner ear is accomplished by tuned hairs cells. This process occurs without a traveling wave (surface wave) on the basilar membrane, and the inner ear theory of Békésy was thus disproved.

== Biography ==
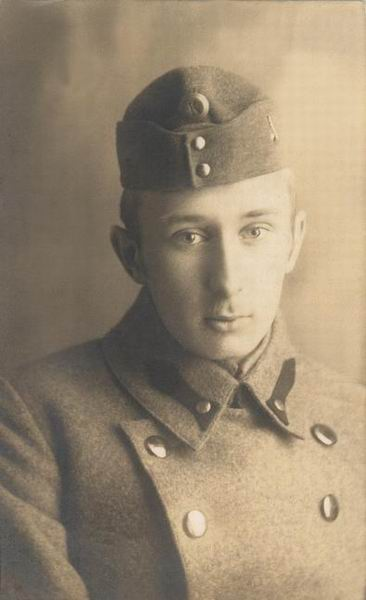
Georg von Békésy in 1918

Békésy was born on 3 June 1899 in Budapest, Hungary, as the first of three children (György 1899, Lola 1901 and Miklós 1903) to Sándor Békésy (1860–1923), an economic diplomat, and to his mother Paula Mazaly.

The Békésy family was originally Reformed but converted to Catholicism. His mother, Paula Mazaly (1877–1974) was born in Szagolyca (now Čađavica, Croatia). His maternal grandfather was from Pécs. His father was born in Kolozsvár (now Cluj-Napoca, Romania).

Békésy went to school in Budapest, Munich, and Zürich. He studied chemistry in Bern and received his PhD in physics on the subject: "Fast way of determining molecular weight" from the University of Budapest in 1926.

He then spent one year working in an engineering firm. He published his first paper on the pattern of vibrations of the inner ear in 1928. He was offered a position at Uppsala University by Róbert Bárány, which he declined because of the hard Swedish winters.

Before and during World War II, Békésy worked for the Hungarian Post Office (1923 to 1946), where he did research on telecommunications signal quality. This research led him to become interested in the workings of the ear. In 1946, he left Hungary to follow this line of research at the Karolinska Institute in Sweden.

In 1947, he moved to the United States, working at Harvard University until 1966. In 1962 he was elected a Member of the German Academy of Sciences Leopoldina. After his lab was destroyed by fire in 1965, he was invited to lead a research laboratory of sense organs in Honolulu, Hawaii. He became a professor at the University of Hawaiʻi in 1966 and died in 1972, in Honolulu.

He became a well-known expert in Asian art. He had a large collection which he donated to the Nobel Foundation in Sweden. His brother, Dr. Miklós Békésy (1903-1980), stayed in Hungary and became a famous agrobiologist who was awarded the Kossuth Prize.

== Research ==
Békésy developed a method for dissecting the inner ear of human cadavers while leaving the cochlea partly intact. By using strobe photography and silver flakes as a marker, he was able to observe that the basilar membrane moves like a surface wave when stimulated by sound. Because of the structure of the cochlea and the basilar membrane, different frequencies of sound cause the maximum amplitudes of the waves to occur at different places on the basilar membrane along the coil of the cochlea. High frequencies cause more vibration at the base of the cochlea while low frequencies create more vibration at the apex.

Békésy concluded from these observations that by exciting different locations on the basilar membrane different sound wave frequencies excite different nerve fibers that lead from the cochlea to the brain. He theorized that, due to its placement along the cochlea, each sensory cell (hair cell) responds maximally to a specific frequency of sound (the so-called tonotopy). Békésy later developed a mechanical model of the cochlea, which confirmed the concept of frequency dispersion by the basilar membrane in the mammalian cochlea.

Békésy fully neglected the sharp discontinuities of the basilar membrane seen in many mammalian species, for example Old World and New World desert rodents, even though this anatomical evidence had already been widely published during his lifetime. Thus, he missed seeing that his traveling wave theory was not compatible with cochlear anatomy.

Békésy's theory purported to explain every feature of the auditory sensation owing to passive mechanical phenomena. Later David Kemp, showed that that is unrealistic and that active feedback is necessary. Finally, in 2025 A. James Hudspeth and his research team – based on "a groundbreaking technological advancement" – established that also in mammals frequency analysis in the inner ear occurs without a traveling wave on the basilar membrane, and the inner ear theory of Békésy was thus disproved.

== Awards ==
Békésy's honours include:

- The Denker Prize in Otology (1931), The Leibniz Medal of the Berlin Academy of Sciences (1937), The Guyot Prize for Speech and Otology of Groningen University (1939), The Academy Award of the Budapest Academy of Science (1946), Shambough Prize in Otology (1950).
- Honorary doctorates (M.D.) were conferred on him by the University of Munster (1955), Bern (1959), Padua (1962), Buenos Aires (1968), Cordoba (1968), Hawaii (1969) and Semmelweiss University, Budapest (1969).
