= Congressional Hearing Health Caucus =

Caucus of the United States Congress

The Congressional Hearing Health Caucus, a caucus of the United States Congress, was created in 2001 in cooperation with the National Campaign for Hearing Health, a public education and advocacy project run by the Deafness Research Foundation (now called the Hearing Health Foundation.) The focus of the Congressional Hearing Health Caucus includes several aims that promote hearing health and encourage universal newborn hearing health screenings for all Americans. Those most at risk for hearing-related concerns are newborns, infants, and the elderly, particularly if such issues are left undetected. Therefore, a primary goal of the Congressional Hearing Health Caucus is to see that auditory abilities of all Americans are screened, including universal hearing screening for newborns. One of the co-founders and co-chairmen of the Caucus was former Congress Member James T. Walsh (R-NY). The Director of the National Campaign for Hearing Health at the time of launch of the CHHC, was Elizabeth Thorp, who had herself been born with unilateral deafness not discovered until she was eight years old.

Current co-chairs of the Committee are David McKinley (R-WV) and Mike Thompson (D-CA).

== Background ==
Walsh and other Congress members recognized the need for hearing screenings for everyone, but particularly for newborns and infants, as well as individuals who were aging, including American veterans.

== Related activities ==
In association with his leadership activities of the Caucus, Walsh promoted passage of an act that guaranteed hearing screenings for newborns and infants. The Newborn and Infant Screening and Intervention Program Act was authored and sponsored, mainly, by Walsh in 1999. On March 11, 2009, the act was renamed as the James T. Walsh Universal Newborn Hearing Screening Program, and was identified within 42 United States Code 280g-1. The Act is for "the early detection, diagnosis, and treatment regarding hearing loss in newborns and infants," and includes several provisions so that these endeavors may be accomplished.

Additionally, in 1991, Walsh sponsored and introduced the Hearing Loss Testing Act.
