= James T. Walsh =

American politician (born 1947)

Jim Walsh
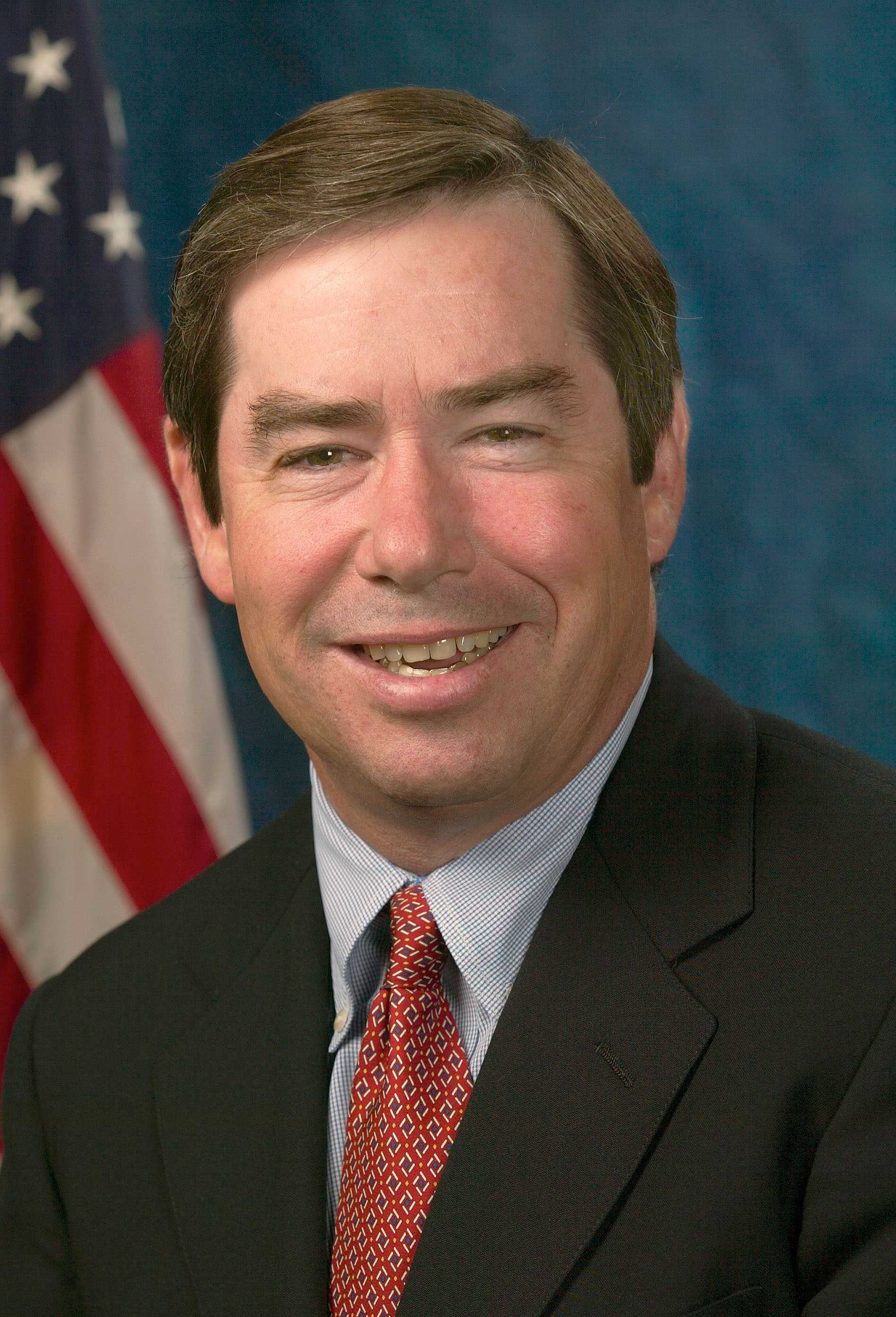

Member of the U.S. House of Representatives from New York
- In office January 3, 1989 – January 3, 2009
- Preceded by: George C. Wortley
- Succeeded by: Dan Maffei
- Constituency: 27th district (1989-1993); 27th district (1993-2009)

Personal details
- Born: James Thomas Walsh; June 19, 1947 (age 79) Syracuse, New York, U.S.
- Party: Republican
- Spouse: DeDe Walsh
- Children: 3, including Ben
- Relatives: William F. Walsh (father)
- Education: St. Bonaventure University (BA)

James Thomas Walsh (born June 19, 1947) is an American Republican politician from Syracuse, New York. Walsh served in the United States House of Representatives from 1989 until his retirement from the House in 2009. Walsh represented a portion of Central New York. After his congressional tenure, Walsh became a government affairs counselor for K & L Gates in Washington, DC.

Known as a moderate, pro-labor Republican, Walsh was a member of the United States House Committee on Appropriations for 16 years. He also chaired the United States House Appropriations Subcommittee on Military Construction, Veterans Affairs, and Related Agencies. Walsh was also active in the peace process in Northern Ireland, for which the Walsh Visa was created and named in his honor. As co-founder and co-chair of the Congressional Hearing Health Caucus, Walsh secured passage of laws aimed at guaranteeing universal hearing screenings for newborns and infants in the United States. In 2009, the James T. Walsh Universal Newborn Hearing Screening Program was enacted. Walsh's change of perspective regarding both of then-President George W. Bush's troop surge of 2007 and ideology regarding the Iraq War caused Walsh's views to gain headlines in the news media; he called for a gradual withdrawal of American troops from Iraq.

During the 1970s and 1980s, Walsh was a member of the Syracuse City Council. He served as its leader for five years. In 1999, he issued a challenge with several goals that is known as The Syracuse Neighborhood Initiative (SNI).

Walsh's father, William F. Walsh, served as Mayor of Syracuse during the 1960s and was a Republican Member of the United States House of Representatives in the 1970s. Walsh's son, Ben Walsh, began serving as Mayor of Syracuse in 2018.

== Early life and education ==
Walsh was born in Syracuse, New York, and graduated from St. Bonaventure University with a bachelor's degree in history. He served in the Peace Corps from 1970 to 1972 in Nepal as an agricultural extension agent.

== Early career ==
Walsh's early employment included work as a Social Services income examiner, and a telephone company executive with both AT&T and NYNEX Telecommunications. He served as Director of the Telecommunication Institute at the SUNY Utica-Rome, and taught telecommunication policy as an adjunct professor.

=== Syracuse City Council ===
From 1977 to 1985, Walsh served on the City Council in Syracuse, New York. He served as president of the Common Council from 1985 to 1988.

== United States House of Representatives ==
=== Elections ===
A Republican, Walsh won a seat in the U.S. House of Representatives in 1988 in what was then the 27th District, handily defeating state Public Service Commissioner Rosemary S. Pooler.

Walsh was re-elected nine times, usually by fairly comfortable margins. The district, which was renumbered as the 25th District after the 1990 census, became increasingly Democratic in the 1990s due to the national Republican Party becoming more conservative. In 1996, he faced a reasonably well-financed challenge from Cortland attorney Marty Mack, and was held to only 53 percent of the vote. He faced his closest-ever race in 2006 against former congressional aide Dan Maffei, winning by only a 51% to 49% margin. He lost Onondaga County, the most populous county in the district and home to Syracuse, but was carried to victory by a strong showing in the more rural areas of the district.

With Maffei priming for a rematch against Walsh in 2008, Walsh announced that January that he would not run for an 11th term. Maffei won the seat in November.

=== Political views ===
In the 109th Congress, Walsh voted along Republican party lines for 84% of his votes. In the 110th Congress, Walsh's votes placed him as a centrist between Democrats and Republicans.

Throughout his twenty years in Congress, Walsh introduced 53 bills, co-sponsored nearly 1,700 bills, and enacted 10 bills.

=== Tenure and political positions ===
==== The War in Iraq ====
On September 10, 2007, Walsh stated that he favors a gradual withdrawal of American forces from Iraq. This announcement came months after Walsh opposed President George W. Bush's troop surge of 2007. Walsh claims that it was a result of personally going to Iraq, and finding that the Iraqi government and military have not done enough on their end.

Regarding his thoughts about Iraq and the War in Iraq, Walsh is quoted in Peace Corps Online, from an excerpt from his personal diary of 2007, stating:

Our troops have done everything we've asked of them and more. They've performed brilliantly in an incredibly hostile environment. We've given them their freedom, eliminated Saddam, protected them as they voted, chose an interim government, created a constitution, and elected a democratically-elected government. I believe we've done everything we set out to do. I believe its time to start bringing our soldiers home. They've done their job; it's now up to the Iraqis. If they truly want the democracy, they have to learn compromise and share power. This could take a long time. We've been there for them for five years now. That's enough. By beginning to draw down troops, we send a very clear signal to the political leaders that it's now their time to lead. A gradual drawdown will give them the time they need to make the hard decisions that are required.

Walsh supported a bipartisan bill that would set a withdrawal date for American troops to leave Iraq.

==== Veterans affairs ====
===== MilQual budget appropriations =====
As Chair of the Appropriation's Committee's Subcommittee on Military Construction, Veterans Affairs and Related Agencies during the 109th Congress, Walsh chaired Chair of MilQual, the third largest of the 10 appropriations budgets at approximately $115 billion. In that capacity, Walsh had spending oversight for the Department of Veterans Affairs, Defense health programs, as well as all Department of Defense installation construction/improvement, and military family housing accounts.

===== Healthcare improvements for veterans =====
Walsh secured improvements in care for American veterans, particularly those in the Syracuse, New York area. Included in federal funding secured by Walsh was $3.8 million that was used in the construction of the Syracuse Veterans Administration (VA) Medical Center Emergency Department, as well as $3.5 million for the medical center's MRI facility, and additional federal monies for the Spinal Cord Injury Center addition in 2008.

===== Hancock Air National Guard Base =====
Walsh proposed many bills aimed at funding for, and was supportive of, the Hancock Air National Guard Base in Syracuse during his tenure in Congress. The base was constructed in 1941 during World War II shortly after the attacks on Pearl Harbor. Originally known as the Syracuse Army Air Base (a.k.a. Mattydale Bomber Base), the base was renamed after Congressman Clarence E. Hancock and now serves as the home of the New York Air National Guard 174 Attack Wing (formerly 174 Fighter Wing), known as Hancock Field ANG Base. Syracuse Hancock International Airport, serving more than 2 million air travelers each year, is located across the street from the Hancock Field.

===== 2008 National Military Appreciation Month event =====
Walsh attended an event on Capitol Hill in May 2008 to recognize National Military Appreciation Month. Several United Service Organizations (USO) groups, including members of the USO Congressional Caucus, USO World Board of Governors, USO World Strategic Partners, Congress members, and senior military officials came together to fill 3,000 Operation USO Care Packages for American troops overseas, as well as to recognize the nearly 70-year history of the USO. The USO is a non-profit organization that provides welfare, morale, and recreational services to American military personnel and their families.

==== Healthcare and related issues ====
===== Hearing health =====
Walsh was active in the passage of an act that guaranteed hearing screenings for newborns and infants. In 1991, Walsh sponsored and introduced the Hearing Loss Testing Act. The Newborn and Infant Screening and Intervention Program Act was authored and sponsored, mainly, by Walsh in 1999. On March 11, 2009, the act was renamed as the James T. Walsh Universal Newborn Hearing Screening Program, and was identified within 42 United States Code 280g-1. The Act is for "the early detection, diagnosis, and treatment regarding hearing loss in newborns and infants," and includes several provisions so that these endeavors may be accomplished.

===== Child nutrition =====
As a leader in child nutrition in the US, Walsh is nationally recognized through his support of both The Emergency Food Assistance Program (TEFAP) and the Women with Infants and Children program (WIC). In the US House of Representatives, Walsh also sponsored the Hunger Has a Cure bill.

===== Stem cell research =====
Walsh has been an advocate of stem cell research, although he is opposed to using embryos as a source of the stem cells for such research. Walsh explained in his former congressional blog in entry #2 about these of his perspectives regarding stem cell research. In votes recorded from 1996 to 2007, however, he has consistently voted against bills regarding stem cell research, human cloning, and human embryo research.

==== Ireland, Northern Ireland, Peace Process, and Walsh Visa ====
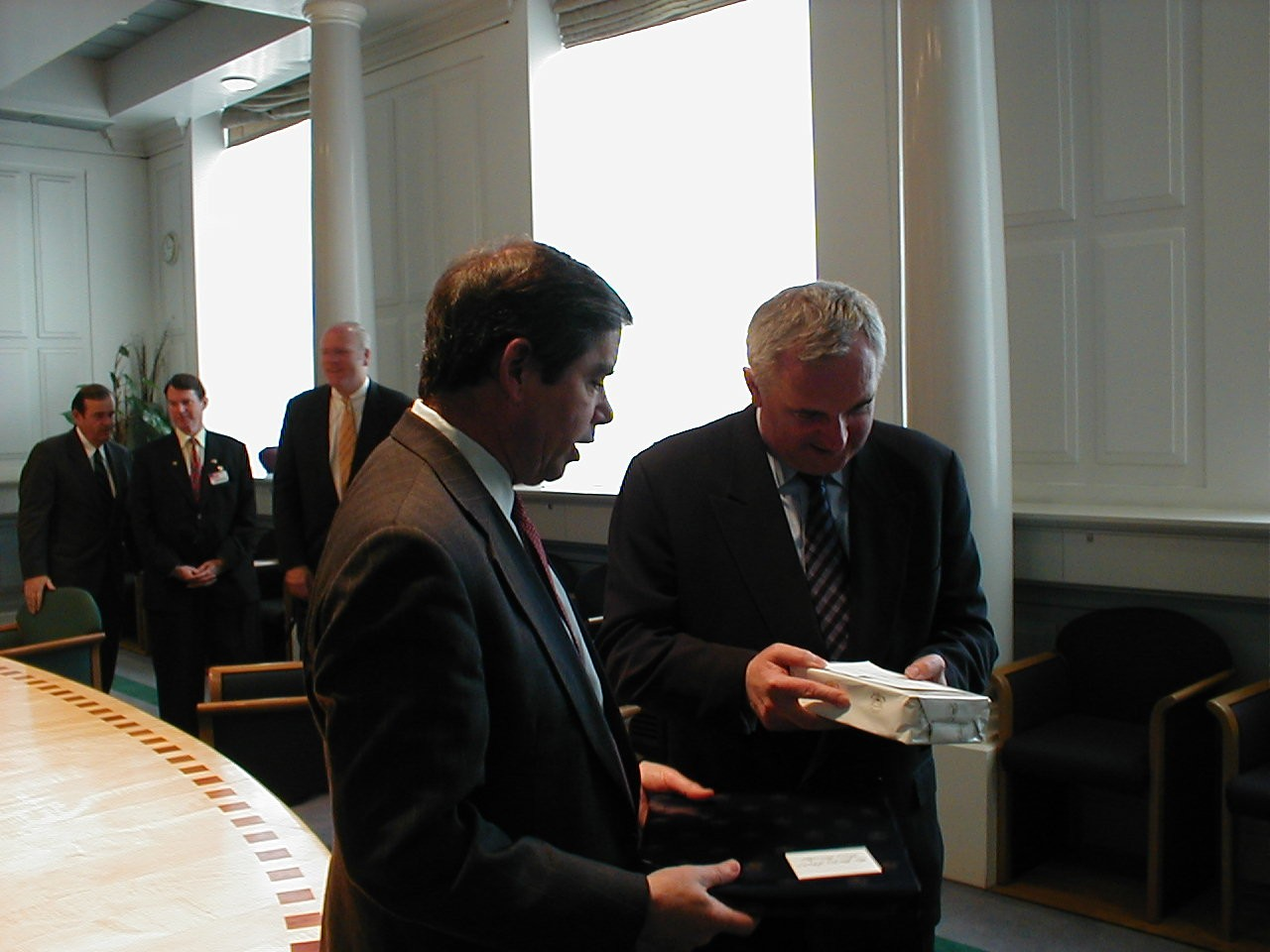
Walsh with Bertie Ahern in 2002

Walsh is also known for his active and consistent efforts at supporting peace for Northern Ireland. In 1995, Walsh was the chair of an historic delegation from Congress to Northern Ireland with President Bill Clinton, being the first visit of this type by a sitting US president. Following that time, Walsh led additional delegations, and was a Distinguished Delegation member, accompanying Clinton to Ireland in 1998 after the ratification of the Good Friday Agreement.

Through his efforts at promoting peace in Northern Ireland in the 1990s, created and established in 1998 was the Walsh Visa program, an exchange program for Irish adults to spend up to two years in the US, gaining enriching employment, educational, and conflict resolution experiences. The Walsh Visa program, also known as The Irish Peace Process Cultural and Training Program, was sponsored by the United States Department of State, Bureau of European Affairs, ending in 2008.

Of the Walsh Visa program, Walsh is quoted on the official Embassy of the United States: Dublin, Ireland website, stating:

This visa represents an American commitment to provide support for the peace process and all that it promises for the people of Ireland and Northern Ireland.

In 2006, Walsh and both Congress Members Brian Higgins and Tim Murphy met with several government leaders in Ireland in which there was a confirmation announcement of the Irish Republican Army (IRA) weapons decommissioning. Government leaders with whom the three congress members met included Irish Foreign Minister Dermot Ahern, Secretary of State for Northern Ireland Peter Hain, US Ambassador to Ireland James C. Kenny, US Ambassador to the United Kingdom Robert H. Tuttle, and the leadership of each of the main political parties involved in the process for peace.

In 2019, Walsh alongside a number of other Irish American political and civil society figures founded the bipartisan Ad Hoc Committee to Protect the Good Friday Agreement. He currently serves as co-chair of the committee alongside fellow co-chair, Democrat Bruce Morrison.

==== Immigration ====
Further, Walsh made efforts to assist many immigrants in the United States with obtaining citizenship.

Of his efforts at helping immigrants, such as with receiving their green cards and/or US citizenship, Walsh is re-quoted from 2002 in a December 28, 2008 article in The Post-Standard by Maureen Sieh, stating:

If the government has a responsibility to someone, we feel it's our responsibility to help keep that commitment.

==== The environment ====
===== Global warming =====
In 2004, Walsh was among co-sponsors of a US House bill to combat global warming. The bill was the first of its kind to be introduced in the US House of Representatives.

===== Erie Canal and Erie Canalway National Heritage Corridor =====
In 2005, Walsh and Congress Member Brian Higgins worked together on a bipartisan approach to seeking funding for the redefinition of the New York State Canal System to be associated with the Erie Canal and Erie Canalway National Heritage Corridor Act of 2000.

===== Onondaga Lake clean-up =====
A supporter of cleaning up Onondaga Lake in New York State near Syracuse, Walsh achieved the securing of $160 million in federal funds for the effort. Following many years of pollution by industrial waste and sewage overflow, the lake had become a public hazard. The clean-up efforts have vastly improved the water quality of the lake, having reduced pollution and improved sewage treatment, as well as contributing to the area's economic value through tourism.

===== US Botanic Garden restoration =====
Walsh also led the restoration effort of the historic US Botanic Garden, one of the oldest in North America.

==== Peace Corps expansion ====
In 1998, the US House of Representatives considered expanding the Peace Corps, and Walsh spoke in Nepalese in a statement to the Committee on International Relations, expressing about his experiences as well as his support for the expansion of the program.

In part, Walsh is quoted from his statement given in the House of Representatives in 1998 regarding his experiences with the Peace Corps in Nepal, as well as his support for Peace Corps' expansion, stating:

I think we all gained far more than we gave, but we did give something, and what this country gave us is something we would like to continue to give to other young people. It is a vent for that idealism that we all have at that point in our lives. It is a way to give something back to our country and to the rest of the world. It is a way to show the rest of the world that we are a good global neighbor and that we care about what goes on in the world. We are not just sending troops to troubled spots, but we are sending friends, young people full of idealism and good ideas and bringing with them vigor and strength to help them solve some of their problems ... I support this expansion of the Peace Corps, and I am very proud to join my distinguished colleagues to ask you to support it, too.

==== Federal funding for technology-related projects ====
Throughout his tenure in Congress, Walsh secured numerous technology-related grants, federal monies, and support valued at hundreds of millions of dollars for New York State and other states in America, a few of which include Michigan, Tennessee, and Florida.

==== Syracuse Neighborhood Initiative ====
In 1999, Walsh issued a challenge called The Syracuse Neighborhood Initiative (SNI) in support of these endeavors. Goals of the Initiative included: "1) To position our neighborhoods to successfully compete for investment; 2) To improve the quality of life in our neighborhoods; 3) To strengthen community; [and] 4) To help neighborhood residents to build assets."

In 2004, Walsh secured nearly $5 million in federal funding for the SNI's Phase VI continued revitalization efforts for the City of Syracuse.

Regarding the funding he secured in 2004 for SNI's Phase VI, Walsh is quoted in a March 20, 2006 Honeywell article, stating:

The Syracuse Neighborhood Initiative is making a difference in every corner of the city. SNI Phase VI will bring a new focus and new opportunities to the architecturally important Park Avenue neighborhood while providing the gap funding needed to make various neighborhood stabilization projects a reality in key areas across the city.

The year 2008 saw Walsh's efforts for SNI achieve $1.2 million in federal funding for Phase VIII of the project. At that time, Walsh had secured more than $50 million in federal housing funding for the revitalization and improvement program.

==== Higher education institutional support ====
===== St. Bonaventure University =====
Included in the receipt of federal funds proposed by Walsh was his alma mater, St. Bonaventure University, in the construction and establishment of the William F. Walsh Science Center, named in honor of his father, in 2006, as well as for the renovation of the university's existing science building, De La Roche Hall. Federal monies secured with his assistance for the Walsh Science Center totaled approximately $10 million, while nearly $1 million was obtained through HUD for refurbishment of De La Roche Hall.

===== Rochester Institute of Technology =====
Walsh has supported endeavors for the development of technology at the Rochester Institute of Technology (RIT), as announced in a 2001 press release from the Office of Congress Member Louise Slaughter. Walsh and Slaughter announced that the House had passed a measure to provide the monies to RIT for the development of the Forest Fires Imaging Experimental System (FIRES), an experimental early warning and detection system regarding forest fires.

Walsh was quoted in regard to the monies for the RIT FIRES technology in the July 31, 2001 news release of Slaughter, stating:

RIT and other research and academic institutions are vital to the Upstate economy. I will continue my work to support these important research facilities. Upstate New York will undoubtedly benefit from this research, and the development of early warning sensors to detect forest fires.

===== Syracuse University =====
Walsh is considered an influential figure in the sustaining of Syracuse University (SU). He has helped get funding for many projects run by SU, including Chancellor Nancy Cantor's Connective Corridor project.

==== Online poker and Internet gambling ====
Walsh is a staunch advocate of a federal prohibition of online poker. In 2006, he cosponsored House Resolution (H.R.) 4411, the Goodlatte-Leach Internet Gambling Prohibition and Enforcement Act and H.R. 4777, the Internet Gambling Prohibition Act.

==== Endorsement of Rudy Giuliani for President in 2008 ====
Walsh was also a prominent endorser of Rudy Giuliani's presidential campaign.

Walsh is quoted as stating of Rudy Giuliani in several media sources on March 6–7, 2007:

I know what Rudy Giuliani can do. I was proud to work with Rudy while he was Mayor and I've seen the direct results of his actions and his demands for accountability and high standards. When times are tough, he's the leader you want, and I'm proud to support him for President.

==== Official congressional blog ====
No longer maintained by the US House of Representatives since Walsh is not currently a congress member is his official congressional blog of two years, from 2006 to 2008. Walsh titled his congressional blog, "Jim's Journal," and it consisted of 24 entries on various political topics. Walsh created the congressional blog to better-inform his constituents about his perspectives. Brief summaries of Walsh's congressional blog are currently housed in the Friedsam Memorial Library Archives of his alma mater, St. Bonaventure University.

=== Committee assignments and duties ===
Walsh was chairman of the Subcommittees on the Departments of Veterans Affairs, and Housing and Urban Development, and Independent Agencies from 2001 to 2007, thus making him one of the so-called "College of Cardinals," or "Cardinals of Spending," of the House due to his influence on national spending policies. It is considered very difficult to unseat an Appropriations Committee member, especially if the member is a "Cardinal."

- Assistant Majority Whip, 1994–2006
- United States House Committee on Appropriations 1993–2009
  - Chair, United States House Appropriations Subcommittee on District of Columbia
  - Chair, United States House Appropriations Subcommittee on Legislative Branch
  - Chair, Subcommittee on Military Construction, Veterans Affairs, and Related Agencies
  - Chair, United States House Appropriations Subcommittee on Military Quality of Life and Veterans' Affairs
  - Ranking Member, Subcommittee on Labor, Health and Human Services, Education and Related Agencies
  - Subcommittee on Transportation, Housing and Urban Development, and Related Agencies
- Member, United States House Committee on Agriculture
- Member, 'United States House Select Committee on Children, Youth, and Families
- Member, United States House Committee on House Administration
- Co-founder and co-chair, Congressional Hearing Health Caucus
- Ad Hoc Committee on Irish Affairs
- Friends of Ireland
- Co-chair of the US-Irish Interparliamentary Group
- Army Caucus
- Congressional Automotive Caucus
- Congressional Boating Caucus
- Congressional Biomedical Research Caucus
- Congressional Caucus on Unfunded Mandates
- Congressional Competitiveness Caucus
- Congressional Fire Services Caucus
- Congressional Steel Caucus
- Minor League Baseball Caucus
- National Guard & Reserve Components Congressional Members Organization

=== Honors and awards ===
In 2002, Walsh received a 2002 Ellis Island Medal of Honor for his efforts in working to promote the Irish Peace Process. The award was presented to Walsh by the National Ethnic Coalition of Organizations, headquartered in New York City.

In June 2003, The Center of Excellence in Environmental Systems, an industry group, presented Congressman Walsh with the Syracuse University Willis H. Carrier Award. This award serves to honor Walsh for his years of service and commitment to protecting the environment and for helping to foster an economic hub for environmental technology through his financial support of the Center of Excellence in Environmental Systems (CoE-ES) and the New York Indoor Environmental Quality Center (NYIEQ).

Walsh has also received many additional awards, including the Exemplary Legislator Award from the Washington, DC National Alliance on Mental Illness – Veterans Council in 2006; Legislator of the Year from Washington, DC's Congressional Fire Services Institute in 2004; and Distinguished Service Award from The American Ireland Fund in Washington, DC in 2001.

Further, he was honored with the Capital Award from the National Council of La Raza in Washington, DC in 2001; Affordable Housing Champion from the National Council of State Housing Agencies in Washington, DC in 2000; and the Flax Trust Award from Flax Trust in Belfast, Northern Ireland in 1997.

Walsh also received the John Philip Sousa Distinguished Service Award in recognition for his efforts at preserving the historic Congressional Cemetery.

In 2013, Walsh, along with his wife, were honored by Le Moyne College at the school's annual Founder's Day Gala, where they received the Simon Le Moyne Award for outstanding leadership to the benefit of society. Given every year since 1968, the Simon Le Moyne Award represents the ideals and educational standards exemplified by the man whose name the college and the award signify. The Reverend Simon Le Moyne, a French Jesuit, was the first white man to visit the Syracuse area when the Onondaga Indians inhabited it. Father Le Moyne established the first mission among the Onondagas in 1654. During the same year, Father Le Moyne learned of the salt wells whose economic importance to the development of the City of Syracuse is an intrinsic part of its history. Ideally, the recipient of the Simon Le Moyne Award should be a person(s) cut of the same cloth as Father Le Moyne, an ambassador of peace and a person of faith.

=== Reflections of others ===
Rudy Giuliani has worked with Walsh, and made a statement in 2007 regarding his work with him.

On March 6, 2007, Giuliani is quoted in two news sources, stating about Walsh and his work with him:

I've always enjoyed working with Jim Walsh. He's a tremendous voice for his district and for New York's congressional delegation ...

== Retirement and post-congressional work ==
After retiring from the U.S. House, Walsh became a lobbyist and government affairs counselor for K & L Gates in Washington, DC. K & L Gates is a law firm that maintains 48 offices throughout the world on five continents.

Walsh has consistently been included on The Hill's list of Top Lobbyists in 2013, 2014, and 2015. Individuals named to this list have proven themselves as being able "to make things happen in Washington."

Of his work in his position with K & L Gates, Walsh is quoted in The Post-Standard on November 9, 2013 in an article by Mark Weiner, stating:

[I bring] the same commitment to high ethical standards to this job as I did to my other careers in public life and private life.

== Community involvement ==
Walsh is active as a board member in several community organizations, with some having included Vera House, the Erie Canal Museum, the Syracuse Children's Chorus, and the Everson Museum of Art. He is also a member of the Republican Main Street Partnership and ConservAmerica, formerly known as the Republicans for Environmental Protection.

Additionally, Walsh is a supporter of the Destiny USA project in Syracuse. Walsh has also been a member of the 9 Mile Republican Club, an advisory council member for Catholic Schools, and Director of RESULTS, a group that is committed to ending hunger and fighting poverty.

Walsh is currently treasurer and board member of the US Association of Former Members of Congress. He is also a member of the board of directors of the Washington Ireland Program; Cooperation Ireland; the Onondaga Environmental Institute; the US Soccer Foundation; the Finger Lakes Land Trust; and the American League of Lobbyists. Additional board memberships include those with the Otisco Lake Association, the Onondaga Anglers Association, and the Oneida Lake Association.

== Personal life ==
Walsh is married to wife, DeDe, and has three adult children, Jed, Ben, and Maureen. Ben Walsh refused to affiliate with the Republican Party and, when he chose to run for Mayor of Syracuse in 2017, did so on two minor party lines, the Independence Party of New York and Reform Party of New York State; in what was generally seen as an upset, Ben Walsh defeated Democratic Party frontrunner Juanita Perez Williams.

For recreation, Walsh enjoys skiing, hunting, and fishing. In Syracuse, Walsh attended Most Holy Rosary Roman Catholic Church.

Walsh is the son of William and Mary Walsh. Walsh's father, William F. Walsh, served as Mayor of Syracuse from 1961 to 1969, and represented both Central New York and the Finger Lakes region in the US House of Representatives from 1973 to 1979.

U.S. House of Representatives
Preceded by George C. Wortley	Member of the U.S. House of Representatives from New York's 27th congressional district 1989–1993	Succeeded by Bill Paxon
Preceded by Sherwood Boehlert	Member of the U.S. House of Representatives from New York's 25th congressional district 1993–2009	Succeeded by Dan Maffei
U.S. order of precedence (ceremonial)
Preceded by Michael McNulty as Former U.S. Representative	Order of precedence of the United States as Former U.S. Representative	Succeeded by Joe Crowley as Former U.S. Representative
