= David Kemp (physicist) =

British physicist who discovered otoacoustic emissions (born 1945)

David Thomas Kemp CBE FRS (born 24 February 1945) is a British physicist who is a professor working at the UCL Ear Institute in London.

He was educated at King's College London (BSc, 1966; AKC; PhD, 1970). He discovered the phenomenon of otoacoustic emission in July 1978 while working at the Royal National Throat Nose and Ear Hospital. He founded a company that makes equipment to test for hearing defects by detecting otacoustic emission, which is absent in the ears of people suffering deafness caused by cochlear impairment. Because the method does not require any cooperation from the subject, it is valuable for detecting deafness in babies.

He was elected a Fellow of the Royal Society in 2004.

Awards & Achievements

Commander of the British Empire - 2026

American Academy of Audiology International Award for Hearing - 2019

Acoustical Society of America von Békésy Medal - 2017

International Society of Audiology Aram Glorig Award - 2012

American Auditory Society Carhart Award - 2005

Association for Research in Otolaryngology Award of Merit - 2003

ASHA’s Distinguished Contributions Award for Non-ASHA Members - 2003
