= Prestin =

Protein-coding gene in mammals

SLC26A5

Identifiers
- Aliases: SLC26A5, DFNB61, PRES, solute carrier family 26 member 5
- External IDs: OMIM: 604943; MGI: 1933154; GeneCards: SLC26A5

Gene location (Human)
Chr.	Chromosome 7 (human)
Band	7q22.1	Start	103,352,730 bp
Band	7q22.1	End	103,446,207 bp

Gene location (Mouse)
Chr.	Chromosome 5 (mouse)
Band	5 A3|5 9.97 cM	Start	22,015,653 bp
Band	5 A3|5 9.97 cM	End	22,070,602 bp
RNA expression pattern
Bgee	Human / Mouse (ortholog); Top expressed in: testicle; cerebellar cortex; cerebellar hemisphere; right hemisphere of cerebellum; gonad; right lobe of thyroid gland; left lobe of thyroid gland; lactiferous gland; zone of skin; skin of leg / Top expressed in: zygote; secondary oocyte; embryo; morula; yolk sac; blastocyst; primary oocyte; epiblast; superior frontal gyrus; spermatocyte; More reference expression data
BioGPS	n/a
Gene ontology
Molecular function	spectrin binding; protein homodimerization activity; sulfate transmembrane transporter activity; secondary active sulfate transmembrane transporter activity; bicarbonate transmembrane transporter activity; oxalate transmembrane transporter activity; chloride channel activity; transcription factor binding; chloride transmembrane transporter activity
Cellular component	cytoplasm; integral component of membrane; lateral plasma membrane; membrane; plasma membrane; integral component of plasma membrane; basolateral plasma membrane
Biological process	cochlea development; response to potassium ion; positive regulation of cell motility; sulfate transport; regulation of membrane potential; response to thyroid hormone; regulation of intracellular pH; chloride transmembrane transport; hearing; protein tetramerization; negative regulation of ion transmembrane transport; bicarbonate transport; ion transmembrane transport; response to ischemia; anion transmembrane transport; response to salt; transmembrane transport; positive regulation of cell size; regulation of cell shape; response to auditory stimulus; response to salicylic acid; fructose transmembrane transport; oxalate transport; sulfate transmembrane transport
Sources:Amigo / QuickGO
Orthologs
Databases	NCBI: entry; OMA: entry
Species	Human	Mouse
Entrez	375611	80979
Ensembl	ENSG00000170615	ENSMUSG00000029015
UniProt	P58743	Q99NH7
RefSeq (mRNA)	NM_001167962; NM_198999; NM_206883; NM_206884; NM_206885 NM_001321787	NM_030727; NM_001289787; NM_001289788
RefSeq (protein)	NP_001161434; NP_001308716; NP_945350; NP_996766; NP_996767 NP_996768	NP_001276716; NP_001276717; NP_109652
Location (UCSC)	Chr 7: 103.35 – 103.45 Mb	Chr 5: 22.02 – 22.07 Mb
PubMed search
- Wikidata
View/Edit Human	View/Edit Mouse

Prestin is a protein that is critical to sensitive hearing in mammals. It is encoded by the SLC26A5 (solute carrier anion transporter family 26, member 5) gene.

Different variants of this protein are known in the animal world, all involved in hearing or echolocation.

Prestin is the motor protein of the outer hair cells of the inner ear of the mammalian cochlea. It is highly expressed in the outer hair cells, and is not expressed in the nonmotile inner hair cells. Immunolocalization shows prestin is expressed in the lateral plasma membrane of the outer hair cells, the region where electromotility occurs. The expression pattern correlates with the appearance of outer hair cell electromotility.

It is also (in humans at least) under the control of the thyroid. It is found in the ovary of mammals.

== Function ==
Prestin is essential in auditory processing. It is specifically expressed in the lateral membrane of outer hair cells (OHCs) of the cochlea. There is no significant difference between prestin density in high-frequency and low-frequency regions of the cochlea in fully developed mammals. There is good evidence that prestin has undergone adaptive evolution in mammals associated with acquisition of high frequency hearing in mammals. The prestin protein shows several parallel amino acid replacements in bats, whales, and dolphins that have independently evolved ultrasonic hearing and echolocation, and these represent rare cases of convergent evolution at the sequence level.

Prestin (mol. wt. 80 kDa) is a member of a distinct family of anion transporters, SLC26. Members of this family are structurally well conserved and can mediate the electroneutral exchange of chloride and carbonate across the plasma membrane of mammalian cells, two anions found to be essential for outer hair cell motility. Unlike the classical, enzymatically driven motors, this new type of motor is based on direct voltage-to-displacement conversion and acts several orders of magnitude faster than other cellular motor proteins. A targeted gene disruption strategy of prestin showed a >100-fold (or 40 dB) loss of auditory sensitivity.

Prestin is a transmembrane protein that mechanically contracts and elongates leading to electromotility of outer hair cells (OHC). Electromotility is the driving force behind the somatic motor of the cochlear amplifier, which is a mammalian evolution that increases sensitivity to incoming sound wave frequencies and, thus, amplifies the signal. Previous research has suggested that this modulation takes place via an extrinsic voltage-sensor (partial anion transporter model), whereby chloride binds to the intracellular side of prestin and enters a defunct transporter, causing prestin elongation. However, there is new evidence that prestin acts through an intrinsic voltage-sensor (IVS) in which intracellular chloride binds allosterically to prestin to modify shape.

=== Intrinsic voltage sensing ===
In this model of intrinsic voltage-sensing, the movement of ions generates a nonlinear capacitance (NLC). Based upon the generated voltage and the depolarized or hyperpolarized state of the cell, prestin will transition through two distinct steps, representing the three-state model of prestin modulation. Experiments show that with increasing depolarizing stimuli, prestin transitions from an elongated state to an intermediate state to a contracted state, increasing its NLC. Under hyperpolarizing conditions, NLC decreases and prestin transitions back to its elongated state. Of significance, increased membrane tension as characterized by prestin elongation decreases the chloride allosteric binding site affinity for chloride, perhaps playing a role in regulation of prestin modulation. The total estimated displacement of prestin upon modulation from elongated to contracted state is 3–4 nm^{2}. A recent study supports the IVS model showing that mutations of 12 residues that span the intracellular side of prestin's core membrane resulted in significant decrease in NLC. Eight of the 12 residues were positively charged and are hypothesized to make up the allosteric chloride binding site of prestin.

=== Anion transport ===
Although previously thought to be absent, anion transport has also been shown to be an important aspect of prestin's ability to drive electromotility of hair cells. This mechanism is independent of prestin's voltage-sensing capabilities based upon mutagenesis experiments showing that different mutations lead to effects in either anion-uptake or NLC, but not both. It is suggested that prestin contains an intrinsic anion-uptake mechanism based upon research showing concentration dependent [^{14}C]formate uptake in Chinese hamster ovary (CHO) cells. These results could not be reproduced in oocytes. Therefore, prestin may require an associated cofactor for anion uptake in oocytes; however, this hypothesis is still under question. Experiments have shown that various anions can compete for prestin uptake including malate, chloride, and alkylsulfonic anions.

== Discovery ==
Prestin was discovered by Peter Dallos's group in 2000 and named from the musical notation presto because of the speed of the protein.

The prestin molecule was patented by its discoverers in 2003.

== Clinical significance ==
Mutations in the SLC26A5 gene have been associated with non-syndromic hearing loss.

== Blockers ==
Electromotile function of mammalian prestin is blocked by the amphiphilic anion salicylate at millimolar concentrations. Application of salicylate blocks prestin function in a dose-dependent and readily reversible manner.
