= National Center for Hearing Assessment and Management =

The National Center for Hearing Assessment and Management (NCHAM) was founded in 1990 at Utah State University in Logan, Utah.

== Contributions ==
=== Newborn Hearing Screening ===
From 1988 to 1993, NCHAM conducted the first large-scale clinical trial of universal newborn hearing screening known as the Rhode Island Hearing Assessment Project. Results of this trial were focused on a variety of subjects that were included in the 1993 decision of the National Institutes of Health (NIH) that all newborns should be screened for hearing loss. From 1993 to 1996, NCHAM directed a National Consortium for Newborn Hearing Screening that resulted in over 100 hospitals in 10 states implementing newborn hearing screening programs. From 1996 to 2000, NCHAM staff worked with newborn hearing screening programs in 35 states and provided direct assistance to over 200 hospitals in establishing Early Hearing Detection and Intervention (EHDI) programs. Since April 1, 2000, NCHAM has served as the National Technical Assistance System for EHDI programs and with support from the Maternal and Child Health Bureau, NCHAM has worked with every State and Territorial EHDI program, as well as other professional, governmental, and advocacy groups to expand and improve EHDI programs worldwide.
