= Osseous spiral lamina =

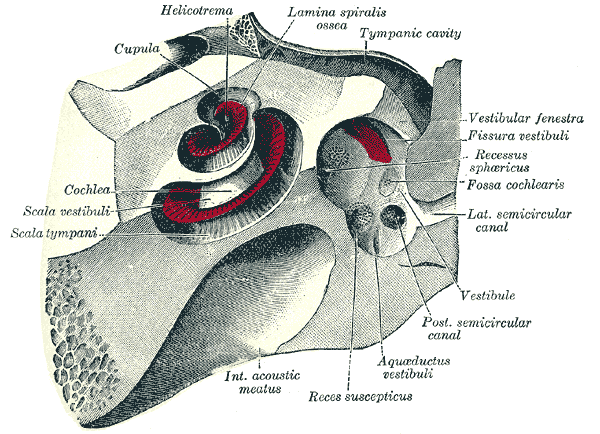
- The cochlea and vestibule, viewed from above. (Lamina spiralis ossea labeled at center top.)

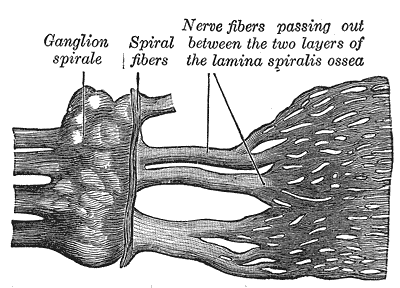
- Part of the cochlear division of the acoustic nerve, highly magnified.

Details

Identifiers
- Latin: lamina spiralis ossea
- MeSH: D013137
- TA98: A15.3.03.029
- TA2: 6973
- FMA: 77710

The osseous spiral lamina is a bony shelf or ledge which projects from the modiolus into the interior of the bony canal of the cochlea, and, like the canal, takes two-and-three-quarter turns around the modiolus.

It reaches about half-way toward the outer wall of the tube, and partially divides its cavity into two passages or scalae, of which the upper is named the scala vestibuli, while the lower is termed the scala tympani.

Near the summit of the cochlea the lamina ends in a hook-shaped process, the hamulus laminae spiralis; this assists in forming the boundary of a small opening, the helicotrema, through which the two scalae communicate with each other.

From the spiral canal of the modiolus numerous canals pass outward through the osseous spiral lamina as far as its free edge.

In the lower part of the first turn a second bony lamina, the secondary spiral lamina, projects inward from the outer wall of the bony tube; it does not, however, reach the primary osseous spiral lamina, so that if viewed from the vestibule a narrow fissure, the vestibule fissure, is seen between them.

== See also ==
- Basilar membrane
