= Inner tunnel =

Structure in the inner ear

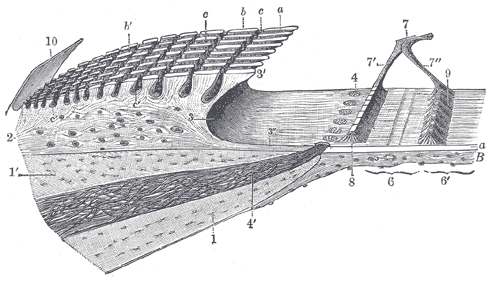
- Limbus laminæ spiralis and membrana basilaris. ("6" is Zona arcuata.)

The basilar membrane stretches from the tympanic lip of the osseous spiral lamina to the basilar crest and consists of two parts, an inner and an outer. The inner is thin, and is named the inner tunnel (or zona arcuata): it supports the spiral organ of Corti.
