= Helicotrema =

Connection between the scala tympani and the scala vestibuli in the cochlea

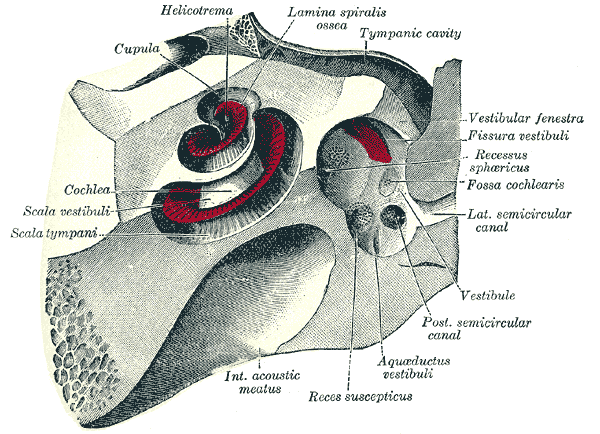
- The cochlea and vestibule, viewed from above.

Details
- Part of: Cochlea
- System: Auditory system
- Function: Connects perilymph of scala tympani and scala vestibuli

Identifiers
- TA98: A15.3.03.044
- TA2: 6969
- FMA: 61275

The helicotrema (from Greek: ἕλιξ [helix] meaning coil and τρη̂μα [trēma] meaning hole), also known as Scarpa hiatus, is the part of the cochlear labyrinth where the scala tympani and the scala vestibuli meet. It is the main component of the cochlear apex. The hair cells near this area best detect low frequency sounds.

== Structure ==
The helicotrema is a part of the cochlear labyrinth where the scala tympani and the scala vestibuli meet. It is the main component of the cochlear apex.

== Function ==
The helicotrema connects the scala tympani and the scala vestibuli. This allows fluid to move between the two. It slightly impedes the travel of sound. The hair cells near this area best detect low frequency sounds.

== Clinical significance ==
The hair cells near the helicotrema are at higher risk of acoustic trauma than those in most other parts of the cochlea. It is also important during ear surgery. When pressure is placed on the perilymph in the cochlea, it reduces pressure and prevents damage to the organ of Corti.
