= SOBP =

Protein-coding gene in the species Homo sapiens

Identifiers
- Aliases: SOBP, JXC1, MRAMS, Sobp, sine oculis binding protein homolog
- External IDs: OMIM: 613667; MGI: 1924427; GeneCards: SOBP

Gene location (Human)
Chr.	Chromosome 6 (human)
Band	6q21	Start	107,490,106 bp
Band	6q21	End	107,661,306 bp

Gene location (Mouse)
Chr.	Chromosome 10 (mouse)
Band	10 B2|10 22.89 cM	Start	42,878,496 bp
Band	10 B2|10 22.89 cM	End	43,050,526 bp
RNA expression pattern
Bgee	Human / Mouse (ortholog); Top expressed in: endothelial cell; middle temporal gyrus; Brodmann area 23; tibia; entorhinal cortex; Brodmann area 46; cerebellar vermis; buccal mucosa cell; orbitofrontal cortex; postcentral gyrus / Top expressed in: Rostral migratory stream; primary visual cortex; dentate gyrus of hippocampal formation granule cell; superior frontal gyrus; muscle of thigh; magnocellular part of medial dorsal nucleus; internal pyramidal layer of neocortex; facial motor nucleus; vestibular membrane of cochlear duct; skeletal muscle tissue; More reference expression data
BioGPS	n/a
Gene ontology
Molecular function	metal ion binding; SUMO polymer binding
Cellular component	nucleus
Biological process	cochlea development; hearing; inner ear morphogenesis; cognition; locomotory behavior
Sources:Amigo / QuickGO
Orthologs
Databases	NCBI: entry; OMA: entry
Species	Human	Mouse
Entrez	55084	109205
Ensembl	ENSG00000112320	ENSMUSG00000038248
UniProt	A7XYQ1	Q0P5V2
RefSeq (mRNA)	NM_018013	NM_175407
RefSeq (protein)	NP_060483	NP_780616
Location (UCSC)	Chr 6: 107.49 – 107.66 Mb	Chr 10: 42.88 – 43.05 Mb
PubMed search
- Wikidata
View/Edit Human	View/Edit Mouse

Sine oculis-binding protein homolog (SOBP) also known as Jackson circler protein 1 (JXC1) is a protein that in humans is encoded by the SOBP gene. The first SOBP gene was identified in Drosophila melanogaster in a yeast two-hybrid screen that used the SIX domain of the Sine oculis protein as bait. In most genomes, which harbor SOBP, the gene is present as a single copy.

== Gene ==
In human, the SOBP gene is located at the long arm of chromosome 6 at 6q21 and it spans a physical distance of slightly more than 171kbp. The mRNA is transcribed from seven exons, oriented from centromere to telomere, of which the first six exons build the open-reading-frame. The coding mRNA counts 2,622 nucleotides that encode a protein of 873 amino acids.

In the mouse, Sopb is located at chromosome 10 at cytogenetic band 10qB2 covering a physical region of 172kbp. As in humans, the mouse Sobp coding region spans six exons but its open-reading-frame is somewhat shorter, counting 2595 nucleotides that encode a protein of 864 amino acids. The protein features two nuclear localization signals on each at its very amino- and carboxy-terminus, two proline-rich sequences in addition to two domains that are related to the FCS-type zinc finger domain. Furthermore, all SOBP proteins share two highly conserved motifs.

== Expression ==
In the mouse, gene expression profiling by RT-PCR showed a wide expression profile in adult and embryonic tissues with strongest expression being in the brain. By RNA in-situ hybridization, Sobp expression in neonatal tissue was demonstrated in spiral ganglion, the sensory and supporting cells of the maculae of saccule and maculae of utricle, and cristae ampullaris. Sobp is also expressed in the inner nuclear layer of the developing retina at E15, the olfactory epithelium, in neurons of the trigeminal ganglion and in cells surrounding the dermal papillae of hair follicles.

== Genetics ==
In human, an autosomal recessive mutation causes severe mental retardation with anterior maxillary protrusion and strabismus, named MRAMS syndrome (OMIM #613671). Homozygosity-mapping linked MRAMS syndrome to a 9.8 Mbp region on 6q21. Evaluation of candidate genes within this interval identified a homozygous missense mutation in SOBP in patients with MARMS syndrome. The mutation truncates the SOBP protein near the carboxy-terminus (p.R661X).

In the mouse, two spontaneous recessive autosomal mutations occurred independently at The Jackson Laboratory that were named jackson circler (jc). The first mutation occurred in 1970 on the C57BL/6J background, named C57BL/6J-jc and the second occurred in a B6.129S6 background and was named jc^{2J}. Genetic linkage analyses localized the mutations to chromosome 10. Molecular genetic studies aimed to identify the genetic defect in the jc locus demonstrated a small deletion of 10bp in exon 6 of the Sobp gene. The deletion comprises nucleotides c.1346-1355 and leads to a frame-shift of the open reading frame introducing a stop codon at amino acid position 490 (S449fsX490). In the jc^{2J} allele, the mutation is a nonsense transversion of a guanine to a thymidine (c.1894G>T) changing a glycine to a stop codon (p.G632X).

== Phenotypes ==
In the mouse, the truncating mutations jc and jc^{2J} lead to profound hearing loss and erratic circling behavior. Specifically, the cochlear duct is shortened, the organ of Corti exhibits supernumerary outer hair cells, mirror image duplications of tunnel of Corti and inner hair cells, as well as ectopic expression of patches of vestibular-like hair cells in Kolliker's organ. The vestibular end organs have a smaller surface area and are thicker.
