= Mechanotransduction =

Conversion of mechanical stimulus of a cell into electrochemical activity

In cellular biology, mechanotransduction (mechano + transduction) is any of various mechanisms by which cells convert mechanical stimulus into a nerve signal. This form of sensory transduction is responsible for a number of senses and physiological processes in the body, including proprioception, touch, balance, and hearing. The basic mechanism of mechanotransduction involves converting mechanical signals into electrical or chemical signals.

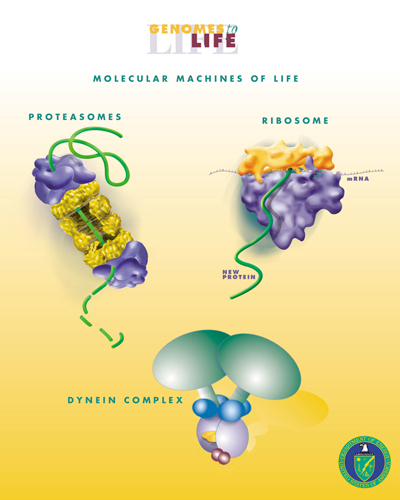
Some biological machines

In this process, a mechanically gated ion channel makes it possible for sound, pressure, or movement to cause a change in the excitability of specialized sensory cells and sensory neurons. The stimulation of a mechanoreceptor causes mechanically sensitive ion channels to open and produce a transduction current that changes the membrane potential of the cell. Typically the mechanical stimulus gets filtered in the conveying medium before reaching the site of mechanotransduction. Cellular responses to mechanotransduction are variable and give rise to a variety of changes and sensations. Broader issues involved include molecular biomechanics.

Single-molecule biomechanics studies of proteins and DNA, and mechanochemical coupling in molecular motors have demonstrated the critical importance of molecular mechanics as a new frontier in bioengineering and life sciences. Current findings indicate that the mechanotransduction channel in hair cells complex biological machine. Mechanotransduction also includes the use of chemical energy to do mechanical work.

== Cellular mechanotransduction ==
Cells continuously detect and respond to mechanical cues in their individual environments: substrate stiffness, shear stress, tension, and compression. These forces are converted into biochemical signals through mechanotransduction pathways, allowing cells to regulate their behavior: migration, death, structural changes, gene expression, and cell differentiation.

=== General cellular mechanotransduction pathway ===
The following are the typical steps of a mechanotransduction pathway:

1. A mechanical force is applied (tension, rigidity, friction, sheer force, etc).
2. A force-sensitive protein (often mechanosensitive channels) responds to the mechanical force.
3. An electrochemical gradient or change in cell polarity is produced directly or indirectly by the force-sensitive protein.
4. This gradient or polarity produces an effect or output that changes cell behavior.

=== Mechanical sensing structures ===
Cells use the following structures in specialized ways to detect mechanical forces.

- Ion channels - mechanosensitive channels modulate their activity based on physical pressures.
- Adhesion GPCRs have been demonstrated to transduce shear stress to intracellular signalling via GPCRs
- Extracellular matrix linked proteins - integrins and focal adhesions can transmit forces from the linked extracellular matrix to the cytoskeleton.
- Cytoskeleton - actin, microtubules, and intermediate filaments act as force-transmitting networks.
- Nucleus - deformations of the nuclear lamina can influence gene expression.

Mechanical forces applied to these structures can activate intracellular signaling pathways, alter cytoskeletal tension, and change gene transcription (see linked sources for specific pathways).

Examples of these mechanical sensing structures leading to mechanotransduced behavior changes are listed below.

Cellular Mechanotransduction Pathway Examples
Mechanical Cue	Cellular Sensor	Common Cellular Response(s)
Substrate stiffness	Integrins, cytoskeleton, nucleus	Differentiation, apoptosis, migration
Sheer stress	Ion channels, glycocalyx	Endothelial alignment
Compression	Cytoskeleton, nucleus	Gene regulation
Tension	Integrins, cytoskeleton	Stress fiber formation, contractility

== Aberrant cellular mechanotransduction ==
Unusual or altered mechanotransduction has been correlated with changes in cell behavior. As well, changes to the medium on which cells grow (the extracellular matrix) can often regulate cell activity through to mechanotransduction. Thus, these changes to the extracellular matrix can result in unhealthy cell activity.

=== Cancer ===
Cell behavior changes resulting from aberrant mechanotransduction may lead to cancer. Substrate stiffness (more abundant around cancerous tissue) can be transduced into signaling pathways that lead to cell death or migration. Apoptosis can be regulated by the stiffness of the extracellular matrix. Rigidity-sensing complexes regulating where cells grow or travel is partially managed by mechanotransduction. Alterations to this rigidity-sensing mechanotransduction can promote cancer: loss in rigidity-sensing complexes can, for example, lead to growth on soft tissue without apoptosis.

Cross-linked extracellular matrix proteins in tumors leads to stiffness that has been shown to favor cancer development. Through mechano-sensitive pathways, this stiffness can lead to metastasis through the stimulation of epithelial-mesenchymal transition (EMT) which is associated with anoikis avoidance - stimulating cell migration.

=== Fibrosis ===
Mechanotransduction pathways, such as FAK-ERK, have been shown to be involved in fibrosis.

== Ear ==
Air pressure changes in the ear canal cause the vibrations of the tympanic membrane and middle ear ossicles. At the end of the ossicular chain, movement of the stapes footplate within the oval window of the cochlea generates a pressure field within the cochlear fluids, imparting a pressure differential across the basilar membrane. A sinusoidal pressure wave results in localized vibrations of the organ of Corti: near the base for high frequencies, near the apex for low frequencies. Hair cells in the cochlea are stimulated when the basilar membrane is driven up and down by differences in the fluid pressure between the scala vestibuli and scala tympani. This motion is accompanied by a shearing motion between the tectorial membrane and the reticular lamina of the organ of Corti, causing the hair bundles that link the two to be deflected, initiating mechano-electrical transduction. When the basilar membrane is driven upward, shear between the hair cells and the tectorial membrane deflects hair bundles in the excitatory direction, toward their tall edge. At the midpoint of an oscillation the hair bundles resume their resting position. When the basilar membrane moves downward, the hair bundles are driven in the inhibitory direction.

== Skeletal muscle ==
When a deformation is imposed on a muscle, changes in cellular and molecular conformations link the mechanical forces with biochemical signals, and the close integration of mechanical signals with electrical, metabolic, and hormonal signaling may disguise the aspect of the response that is specific to the mechanical forces.

== Cartilage ==
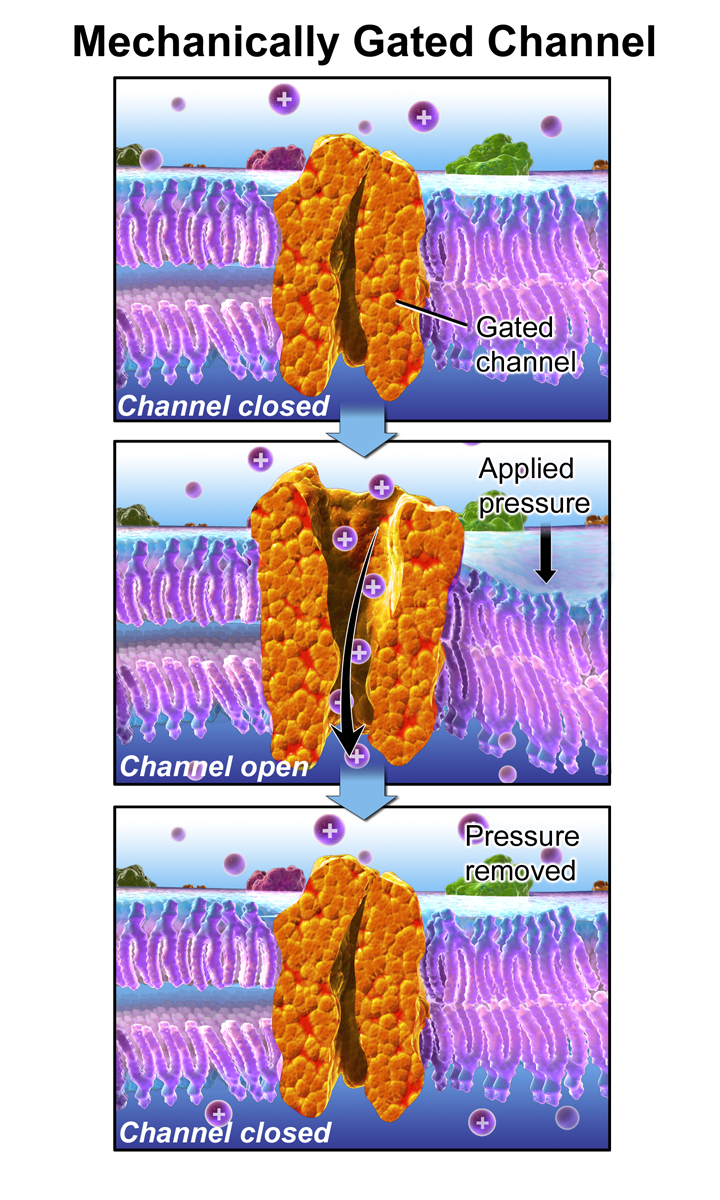
Mechanically gated channel

One of the main mechanical functions of articular cartilage is to act as a low-friction, load-bearing surface. Due to its unique location at joint surfaces, articular cartilage experiences a range of static and dynamic forces that include shear, compression and tension. These mechanical loads are absorbed by the cartilage extracellular matrix, where they are subsequently dissipated and transmitted to chondrocytes (cartilage cells).

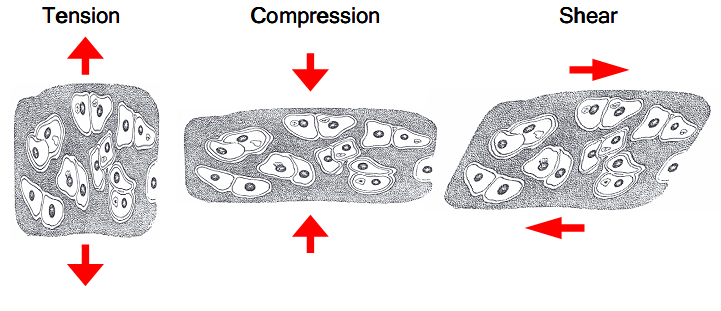
Cartilage experience tension, compression and shear forces in vivo

Chondrocytes sense and convert the mechanical signals they receive into biochemical signals, which subsequently direct and mediate both anabolic (matrix building) and catabolic (matrix degrading) processes. These processes include the synthesis of matrix proteins (type II collagen and proteoglycans), proteases, protease inhibitors, transcription factors, cytokines and growth factors.

The balance that is struck between anabolic and catabolic processes is strongly influenced by the type of loading that cartilage experiences. High strain rates (such as which occurs during impact loading) cause tissue damage, degradation, decreased matrix production and apoptosis. Decreased mechanical loading over long periods, such as during extended bed-rest, causes a loss of matrix production. Static loads have been shown to be detrimental to biosynthesis while oscillatory loads at low frequencies (similar that of a normal walking gait) have been shown to be beneficial in maintaining health and increasing matrix synthesis. Due to the complexity of in-vivo loading conditions and the interplay of other mechanical and biochemical factors, the question of what an optimal loading regimen may be or whether one exists remain unanswered.

Although studies have shown that, like most biological tissues, cartilage is capable of mechanotransduction, the precise mechanisms by which this is done remain unknown. However, there exist a few hypotheses which begin with the identification of mechanoreceptors.

In order for mechanical signals to be sensed, there need to be mechanoreceptors on the surface of chondrocytes. Candidates for chondrocyte mechanoreceptors include stretch-activated ion channels (SAC), the hyaluronan receptor CD44, annexin V (a collagen type II receptor), and integrin receptors (of which there exist several types on chondrocytes).

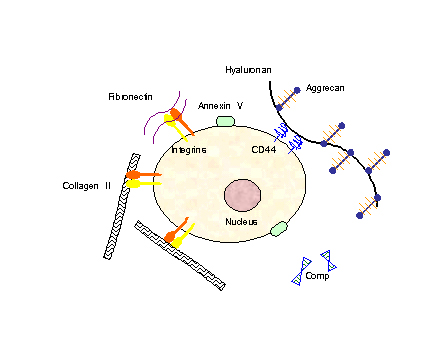
Chondrocyte surface mechano-receptors include CD44, annexin V and integrins. Chondrocyte extracellular matrix components include collagens, proteoglycans (which consist of aggrecan and hyaluronan), fibronectin and COMP.

Using the integrin-linked mechanotransduction pathway as an example (being one of the better studied pathways), it has been shown to mediate chondrocyte adhesion to cartilage surfaces, mediate survival signaling and regulate matrix production and degradation.

Integrin receptors have an extracellular domain that binds to the extracellular matrix proteins (collagen, fibronectin, laminin, vitronectin and osteopontin), and a cytoplasmic domain that interacts with intracellular signaling molecules. When an integrin receptor binds to its extracellular matrix ligand and is activated, additional integrins cluster around the activated site. In addition, kinases (e.g., focal adhesion kinase and adapter proteins (e.g., paxillin, aka Pax, talin, aka Tal, and Shc) are recruited to this cluster, which is called the focal adhesion complex. The activation of these focal adhesion complex molecules in turn, triggers downstream events that up-regulate and/or down-regulate intracellular processes such as transcription factor activation and gene regulation resulting in apoptosis or differentiation.

In addition to binding to extracellular matrix ligands, integrins are also receptive to autocrine and paracrine signals such as growth factors in the TGF-beta family. Chondrocytes have been shown to secrete TGF-b, and upregulate TGF-b receptors in response to mechanical stimulation; this secretion may be a mechanism for autocrine signal amplification within the tissue.

Integrin signaling is just one example of multiple pathways that are activated when cartilage is loaded. Some intracellular processes that have been observed to occur within these pathways include phosphorylation of ERK1/2, p38 MAPK, and SAPK/ERK kinase-1 (SEK-1) of the JNK pathway as well as changes in cAMP levels, actin re-organization and changes in the expression of genes which regulate cartilage extracellular matrix content.

More recent studies have hypothesized that chondrocyte primary cilium act as a mechanoreceptor for the cell, transducing forces from the extracellular matrix into the cell. Each chondrocyte has one cilium and it is hypothesized to transmit mechanical signals by way of bending in response to extracellular matrix loading. Integrins have been identified on the upper shaft of the cilium, acting as anchors to the collagen matrix around it. Recent studies published by Wann et al. in FASEB Journal have demonstrated for the first time that primary cilia are required for chondrocyte mechanotransduction. Chondrocytes derived from IFT88 mutant mice did not express primary cilia and did not show the characteristic mechanosensitive up regulation of proteoglycan synthesis seen in wild type cells

It is important to examine the mechanotransduction pathways in chondrocytes since mechanical loading conditions which represent an excessive or injurious response upregulates synthetic activity and increases catabolic signalling cascades involving mediators such as NO and MMPs. In addition, studies by Chowdhury TT and Agarwal S have shown that mechanical loading which represents physiological loading conditions will block the production of catabolic mediators (iNOS, COX-2, NO, PGE2) induced by inflammatory cytokines (IL-1) and restore anabolic activities. Thus an improved understanding of the interplay of biomechanics and cell signalling will help to develop therapeutic methods for blocking catabolic components of the mechanotransduction pathway. A better understanding of the optimal levels of in vivo mechanical forces are therefore necessary for maintaining the health and viability of cartilage, preventative techniques may be devised for the prevention of cartilage degradation and disease.
