= Vestibular membrane =

Membrane in the cochlea in the inner ear

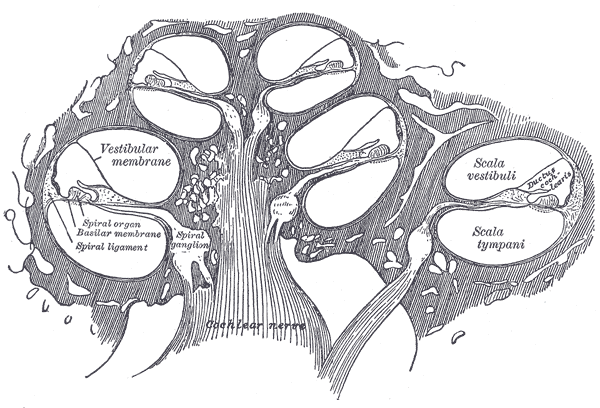
- Cross-section of the cochlea showing the position of the vestibular membrane.

- Cross-section of the cochlea at higher magnification showing the membrane (here labelled "Reissner's membrane")

Details
- Pronunciation: English: /ˈraɪsnər/
- System: Inner ear
- Location: Cochlea of the inner ear

Identifiers
- Latin: membrana vestibularis ductus cochlearis

The vestibular membrane, vestibular wall or Reissner's membrane is a membrane inside the cochlea of the inner ear. It separates the cochlear duct from the vestibular duct. It helps to transmit vibrations from fluid in the vestibular duct to the cochlear duct. Together with the basilar membrane, it creates a compartment in the cochlea filled with endolymph, which is important for the function of the spiral organ of Corti. It allows nutrients to travel from the perilymph to the endolymph of the membranous labyrinth. It may be damaged in Ménière's disease. It is named after the German anatomist Ernst Reissner.

== Structure ==
The vestibular membrane separates the cochlear duct (scala media) from the vestibular duct (scala vestibuli).

=== Microanatomy ===
Histologically, the membrane is composed of two layers of flattened epithelium. These are separated by a basal lamina. Its structure suggests that its function is transport of fluid and electrolytes.

== Function ==
The vestibular membrane helps to transmit vibrations from fluid in the vestibular duct to the cochlear duct.

Together with the basilar membrane, the vestibular membrane creates a compartment in the cochlea filled with endolymph. This is important for the function of the spiral organ of Corti. It primarily functions as a diffusion barrier, allowing nutrients to travel from the perilymph to the endolymph of the membranous labyrinth.

== Clinical significance ==
The vestibular membrane may be ruptured by an increase in the pressure of endolymph in the cochlear duct. This may occur in Ménière's disease.

== History ==
The vestibular membrane is also known as Reissner's membrane. This alternative name is named after German anatomist Ernst Reissner (1824-1878).

== Additional images ==
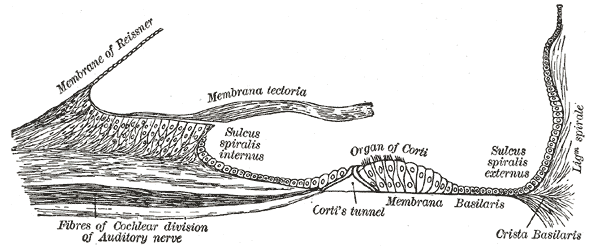
Floor of cochlear duct.

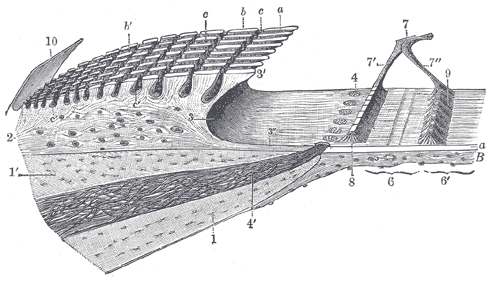
Spiral limbus and basilar membrane.
