= Reticular membrane =

Thin, stiff lamina that extends from the outer hair cells to the Hensen's cells

Reticular membrane (cochlea)
- Section through the spiral organ of Corti. (Reticular membrane not labeled but running through hairs of outer hair cells.)

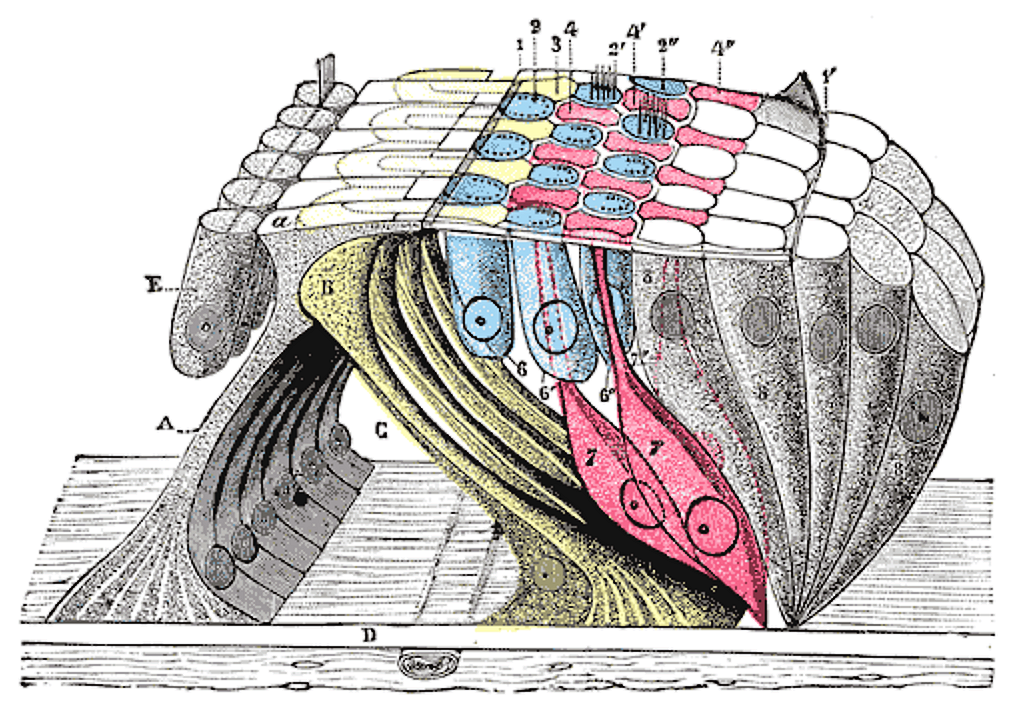
- Section through the spiral organ of Corti showing the lamina reticularis and subjacent structures.

Details

Identifiers
- Latin: membrana reticularis organi spiralis
- TA98: A15.3.03.122
- FMA: 77849

The reticular membrane (RM, also called reticular lamina or apical cuticular plate) is a thin, stiff lamina that extends from the outer hair cells to the Hensen's cells. The RM is composed of "minute-fiddle-shaped cuticular structures" called the phalangeal extensions of the outer hair cells, interspaced with extensions coming from the outer phalangeal cells. The RM separates endolymph in the cochlear duct from underlying corticolymph and perilymph of the scala tympani.

The hair processes of the outer hair cells emerge through and above the RM, thus immobilizing the apical pole of the outer hair cells. At the opposite basilar pole, the outer hair cells are firmly held by the phalangeal cells. The inner phalangeal cells that surround the inner hair cells reach the surface of the organ of Corti, but, even their inner-most row, are not included in the reticular membrane. Thus, the RM up to the outer edge of the tectorial membrane and does not extend unto the surface of the organ of Corti.

== Additional images ==
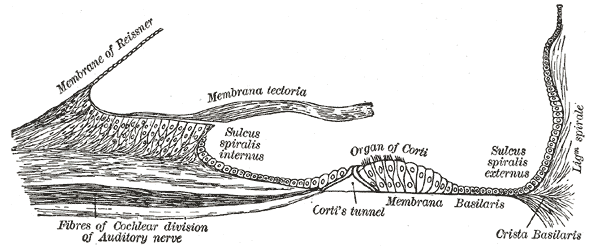
Floor of ductus cochlearis.

Cross section of the cochlea.
