= Endocochlear potential =

The endocochlear potential (EP; also called endolymphatic potential) is the positive voltage of 80-100mV seen in the cochlear endolymphatic spaces. Within the cochlea, the EP varies in magnitude all along its length. When a sound is presented, the endocochlear potential changes either positive or negative in the endolymph, depending on the stimulus. The change in the potential is called the summating potential.

With the movement of the basilar membrane, a shear force is created and a small potential is generated due to a difference in potential between the endolymph (scala media, +80 mV) and the perilymph (vestibular and tympanic ducts, 0 mV). EP is highest in the basal turn of the cochlea (95 mV in mice) and decreases in the magnitude towards the apex (87 mV). In saccule and utricle, endolymphatic potential is about +9 mV and +3mV in the semicircular canal. EP is highly dependent on metabolism and ionic transport.

An acoustic stimulus produces a simultaneous change in conductance at the membrane of the receptor cell. Because there is a steep gradient (150 mV), changes in membrane conductance are accompanied by rapid influx and efflux of ions which in turn produce the receptor potential. This is known as the Battery Hypothesis. The receptor potential for each hair cell causes a release of neurotransmitters at its basal pole, which elicits excitation of the afferent nerve fibres.
