= Otto Deiters =

German anatomist (1834–1863)

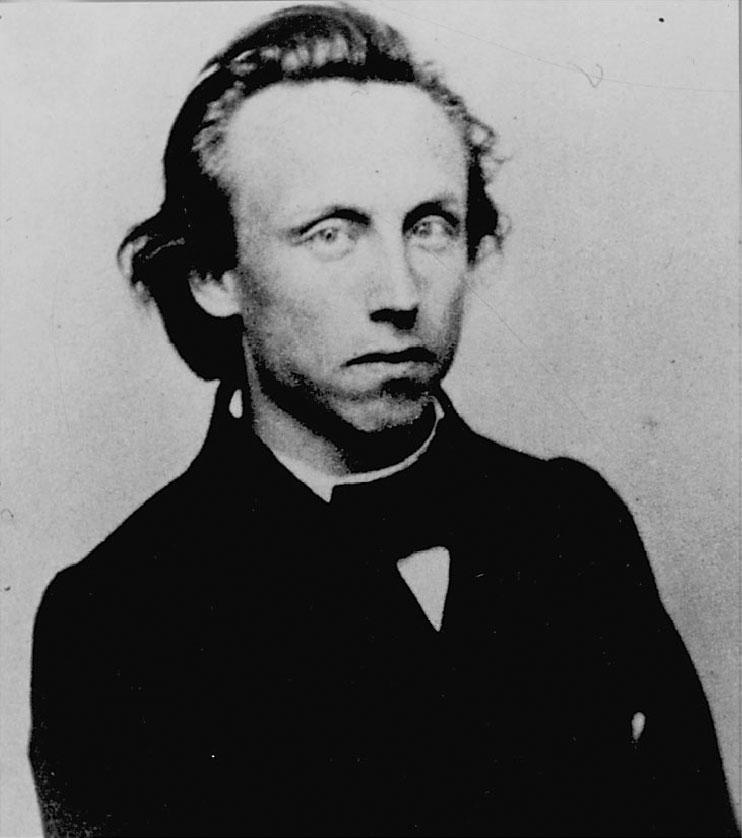
Otto Friedrich Karl Deiters (1834-1863)

Otto Friedrich Karl Deiters (German: [ˈdaɪtɐs]; 15 November 1834 – 5 December 1863) was a German neuroanatomist. He was born in Bonn, studied at the University of Bonn, and spent most of his professional career in Bonn. He is remembered for his microscopic research of the brain and spinal cord.

His name is lent to the "nucleus of Deiters", also called the lateral vestibular nucleus, and to "Deiters' cells", structures that are associated with outer hair cells in the cochlea of the inner ear.

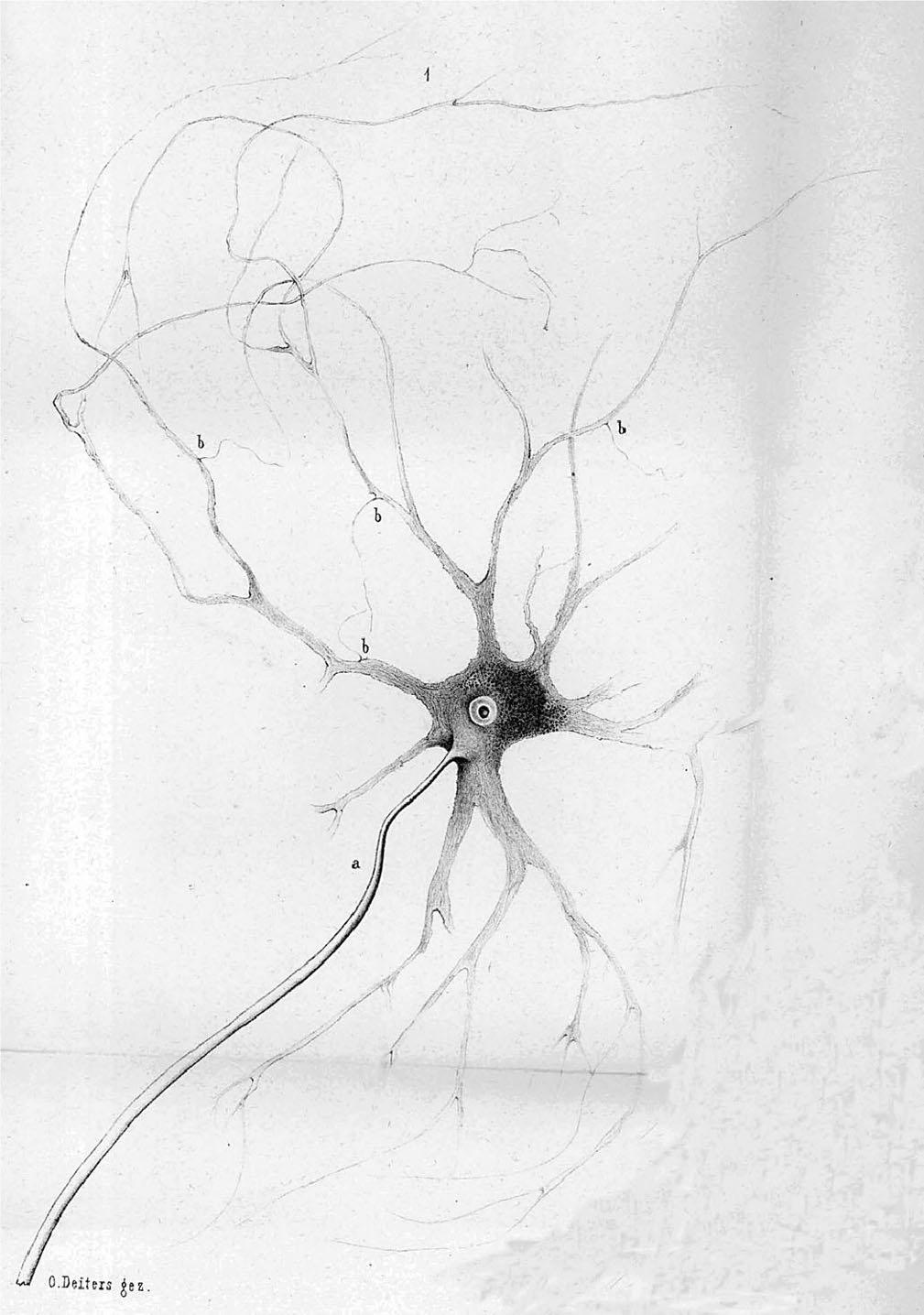
Deiters-axon

Deiters died in 1863 from typhoid fever at the age of 29. Before he died, Deiters provided the most comprehensive description of a nerve cell that was known to exist at the time. He identified the cells' axon, which he called an "axis cylinder", and its dendrites, which he referred to as protoplasmic processes. He postulated that dendrites must fuse to form a continuous network. After his death, in 1865, his work pertaining to nerve cells of the spinal cord was edited and published by anatomist Max Schultze (1825-1874).

== Selected writings ==
- Untersuchungen über die Lamina spiralis membranacea (1860), (includes treatise on Deiters' cells)
- Untersuchungen über Gehirn und Rückenmark des Menschen und der Säugethiere : (edited by Max Schultze) - Braunschweig : Vieweg, (1865)
