= Alfonso Giacomo Gaspare Corti =

Italian physician

Alfonso Corti
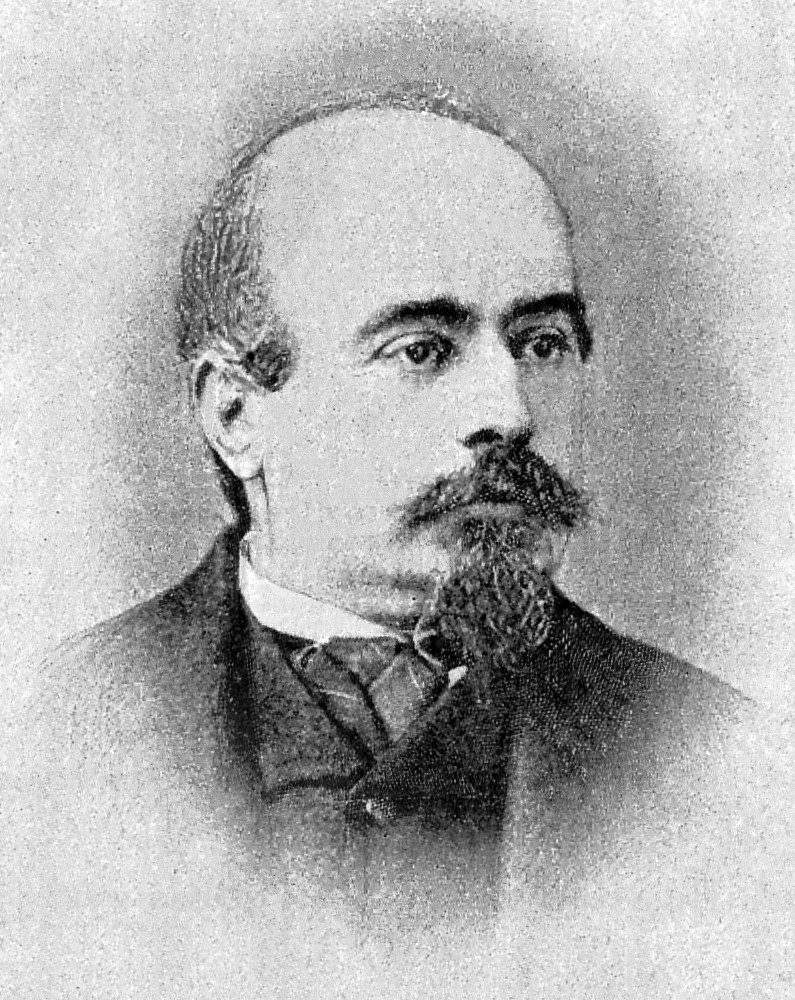
- Born: 15 June 1822; Gambarana, Kingdom of Lombardy–Venetia, Austrian Empire
- Died: 2 October 1888(age 66); Corvino San Quirico, Kingdom of Italy
- Education: University of Pavia
- Known for: Organ of Corti
- Spouse: Maria Bettinzoli (m. 1855, d. 1861)
- Children: 2
- Scientific career
- Fields: medicine

Alfonso Giacomo Gaspare Corti (15 June 1822 – 2 October 1876) was an Italian anatomist. He was born in Gambarana, near Pavia in 1822.

== Education ==
A famous friend of Corti's father, Antonio Scarpa, may have kindled his boyhood interest in anatomy and medicine. As a medical student, he enrolled first at the University of Pavia. Corti's favourite study there was microanatomy with Bartolomeo Panizza and Mario Rusconi. In 1845, against paternal wishes, Corti moved to Vienna to complete his medical studies and to work in the anatomical institute of Joseph Hyrtl. There, he received the degree in medicine in 1847 under the supervision of professor Hyrtl, with a thesis on the bloodstream system of a reptile.

== Career ==
He was then appointed by Hyrtl to be his Second Prosector. With the outbreak of the 1848 Revolution, he left Vienna, and after brief military service in Italy, made visits to eminent scientists in Bern, London, and Paris. At the beginning of 1850, Corti received the invitation of the anatomist Albert Kölliker and moved to Würzburg, where he made friends with Virchow. At the Kölliker Laboratory, he began to work on the mammalian auditory system. Corti spent a short time in Utrecht, where he visited Professors Jacobus Schroeder van der Kolk and Pieter Harting. During his stay, he learned to use methods to preserve several preparations of the cochlea. From Utrecht, he returned to Würzburg to complete his study of at least 200 cochleae of man and different animals. His famous paper, "Recherches sur l'organe de l'ouïe des mammiferes", appeared in 1851 in Kölliker's journal "Zeitschrift für wissenschaftliche Zoologie".

== Marriage, children, illness and death ==
In the same year, after the death of his father, he inherited his father's estate and the title "Marchese de San Stefano Belbo" and moved back to Italy. In 1855, Corti married the daughter from a neighbouring estate, Maria Bettinzoli. His young wife presented him with a daughter, Bianca, and a son, Gaspare, but in 1861 she died, leaving him with the responsibility of rearing the children. Unfortunately, he was gradually developing arthritis deformans. Corti's last 15 years were further darkened by the inexorable progress of his crippling illness. In 1876, on the second of October, he died at Corvino San Quirico.
