= Basilar crest =

Ridge in the cochlear duct of the ear

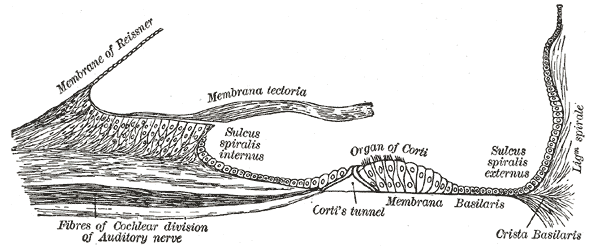
- Floor of cochlear duct

Details

Identifiers
- Latin: Crista basilaris ductus cochlearis

The basilar crest lies within the cochlear duct in the inner ear. It gives attachment to the outer edge of the basilar membrane and is a spiral ligament that projects inward below as a triangular prominence.
