= Basilar papilla =

The basilar papilla is the auditory sensory organ of lizards, amphibians, and birds, which is homologous to the organ of Corti in mammals.

The basilar papilla is composed of cells called "hair cells" which are actually epithelial cells rather than true hairs. These sensory cells, according to some studies, are related to the type II sensory cells in the vestibular epithelium of mammals. These auditory hair cells, unlike those in mammals, are known to spontaneously regenerate following injury, with experimental evidence showing that this ability to proliferate is mediated by a micro-RNA called miR181a.

One amphibian who utilizes the basilar papilla during its mate choice is the spring peeper. The basilar papilla units that are located in the inner ear of the female are tuned between 2100 and 3700 Hz. Low frequency calls exhibited by male spring peepers are easier to detect and are there for favored by the females. The specific tuning of the basilar papilla units within the ear, allows for this mate selection to occur.
