= Deiters' cells =

In the mammalian cochlea, each outer hair cell stands on the soma of a cell of Deiters. What is not apparent in this diagram is that the phalangeal process is tilted out of the plane of this projection, such that its top is near the top of a different outer hair cell, further along in the directional of cochlear wave propagation.

Cross section of the cochlea

Deiters' cells, also known as outer phalangeal cells or cells of Deiters (English: /ˈdaɪtərz/), are a cell type found within the inner ear. They contain both microfilaments and microtubules which run from the basilar membrane to the reticular membrane of the inner ear.

These cochlear supporting cells include a somatic part, with its cupula, and a phalangeal process, which links the Deiters soma to the reticular lamina. The part of the phalanx which is included in the reticular lamina is the apex of the phalanx (phalangeal apex).

The cells are named for neuroanatomist Otto Deiters.

== Bibliography ==
- Hall, James W. (2000) Handbook of otoacoustic emissions Singular Publishing ISBN 978-1-56593-873-1
- O. Deiters (1860) Untersuchungen uber die Lamina spiralis membranacea Henry & Cohen, Bonn
