= Perilymphatic duct =

In the anatomy of the human ear, the perilymphatic duct is where the perilymphatic space (vestibule of the ear) is connected to the subarachnoid space. This works as a type of shunt to eliminate excess perilymph fluid from the perilymphatic space around the cochlea of the ear.

Perilymph is continuous with cerebrospinal fluid (CSF) in the subarachnoid space. CSF pressure abnormalities do not generally have clinical impact on the inner ear which is explained physically by the bore diameter and length of the perilymphatic duct. This duct goes through the skull and is parallel with but not directly associated with the endolymphatic duct. The duct is lined by an epithelium.
