= Hair cell =

Auditory sensory receptor nerve cells

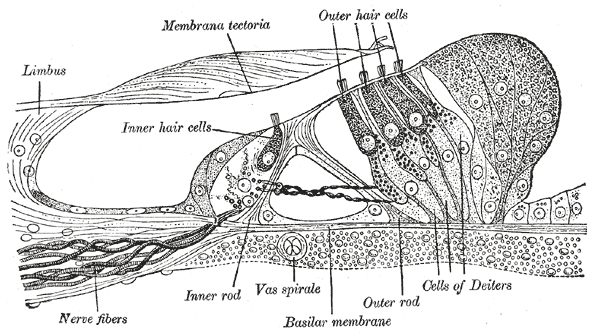
- Section through the spiral organ of Corti. Magnified. ("Outer hair cells" labeled near top; "inner hair cells" labeled near center).

- Cross-section of the cochlea. The inner hair cells are located at the termination of the "inner hair cell nerves" and the outer hair cells are located at the termination of the "outer hair cell nerve".

Details
- Location: Cochlea
- Shape: Unique (see text)
- Function: Amplify sound waves and transduce auditory information to the brainstem
- Neurotransmitter: Glutamate
- Presynaptic connections: None
- Postsynaptic connections: Via auditory nerve to vestibulocochlear nerve to inferior colliculus

Identifiers
- NeuroLex ID: sao1582628662, sao429277527

How sounds make their way from the source to your brain

Hair cells are the sensory receptors of both the auditory system and the vestibular system in the ears of all vertebrates, and in the lateral line organ of fishes. Through mechanotransduction, hair cells detect movement in their environment.

In mammals, the auditory hair cells are located within the spiral organ of Corti on the thin basilar membrane in the cochlea of the inner ear. They derive their name from the tufts of stereocilia called hair bundles that protrude from the apical surface of the cell into the fluid-filled cochlear duct. The stereocilia number from fifty to a hundred in each cell while being tightly packed together and decrease in size the further away they are located from the kinocilium. The vertices of all hair bundles point away from the center of the cochlea because bundle deflection only in the direction of the longest stereocilia leads to increased possibility of mechanotransduction.

Hair cells are organized tonotopically. Hair cells at the base of the cochlea respond best to high-frequency sounds, while those at the apex respond best to low-frequency sounds. The cilia are taller in the apex and shorter in the base, maintaining an orderly gradation along the cochlea's length. The physical and functional properties of these structures vary systematically along the tonotopic axis of the auditory system. For example, hair bundles might be longer or shorter, or synapses might be more or fewer or have different properties, depending on whether they are associated with high-frequency or low-frequency regions.

Mammalian cochlear hair cells are of two anatomically and functionally distinct types, known as outer and inner hair cells. Damage to these hair cells results in decreased hearing sensitivity, and because the inner ear hair cells cannot regenerate, this damage is permanent. Damage to hair cells can cause damage to the vestibular system and therefore cause difficulties in balancing. However, other vertebrates, such as the frequently studied zebrafish, and birds have hair cells that can regenerate. The human cochlea contains on the order of 3,500 inner hair cells and 12,000 outer hair cells at birth.

The outer hair cells mechanically amplify low-level sound that enters the cochlea. The amplification may be powered by the movement of their hair bundles, or by an electrically driven motility of their cell bodies. This so-called somatic electromotility amplifies sound in all tetrapods. It is affected by the closing mechanism of the mechanical sensory ion channels at the tips of the hair bundles.

The inner hair cells transform the sound vibrations in the fluids of the cochlea into electrical signals that are then relayed via the auditory nerve to the auditory brainstem and to the auditory cortex.

The tectorial membrane (TM) overlying the sensory inner hair cells and electrically-motile outer hair cells stimulates IHCs through fluid coupling and the OHCs via direct connection to their tallest stereocilia.

== Inner hair cells – from sound to nerve signal ==
Section through the organ of Corti, showing inner and outer hair cells

The deflection of the hair-cell stereocilia opens mechanically gated ion channels that allow any small, positively charged ions (primarily potassium and calcium) to enter the cell. Unlike many other electrically active cells, the hair cell itself does not fire an action potential. Instead, the influx of positive ions from the endolymph in the scala media depolarizes the cell, resulting in a receptor potential. This receptor potential opens voltage gated calcium channels; calcium ions then enter the cell and trigger the release of neurotransmitters at the basal end of the cell. The neurotransmitters diffuse across the narrow space between the hair cell and a nerve terminal, where they then bind to receptors and thus trigger action potentials in the nerve. In this way, the mechanical sound signal is converted into an electrical nerve signal. Repolarization of hair cells is done in a special manner. The perilymph in the scala tympani has a very low concentration of positive ions. The electrochemical gradient makes the positive ions flow through channels to the perilymph.

Hair cells chronically leak Ca^{2+}. This leakage causes a tonic release of neurotransmitter to the synapses. It is thought that this tonic release is what allows the hair cells to respond so quickly in response to mechanical stimuli. The quickness of the hair cell response may also be due to the fact that it can increase the amount of neurotransmitter release in response to a change of as little as 100 μV in membrane potential.

Hair cells are also able to distinguish tone frequencies through one of two methods. The first method, found only in non-mammals, uses electrical resonance in the basolateral membrane of the hair cell. The electrical resonance for this method appears as a damped oscillation of membrane potential responding to an applied current pulse. The second method uses tonotopic differences of the basilar membrane. This difference comes from the different locations of the hair cells. Hair cells that have high-frequency resonance are located at the basal end while hair cells that have significantly lower frequency resonance are found at the apical end of the epithelium.

== Outer hair cells – acoustical pre-amplifiers ==
In mammalian outer hair cells, the varying receptor potential is converted to active vibrations of the cell body. This mechanical response to electrical signals is termed somatic electromotility; it drives variations in the cell's length, synchronized to the incoming sound signal, and provides mechanical amplification by feedback to the traveling wave.

Outer hair cells are found only in mammals. While hearing sensitivity of mammals is similar to that of other classes of vertebrates, without functioning outer hair cells, the sensitivity decreases by approximately 50 dB. Outer hair cells extend the hearing range to about 200 kHz in some marine mammals. They have also improved frequency selectivity (frequency discrimination), which is of particular benefit for humans, because it enabled sophisticated speech and music. Outer hair cells are functional even after cellular stores of ATP are depleted.

The effect of this system is to nonlinearly amplify quiet sounds more than large ones so that a wide range of sound pressures can be reduced to a much smaller range of hair displacements. This property of amplification is called the cochlear amplifier.

The molecular biology of hair cells has seen considerable progress in recent years, with the identification of the motor protein (prestin) that underlies somatic electromotility in the outer hair cells. Prestin's function has been shown to be dependent on chloride channel signaling and that it is compromised by the common marine pesticide tributyltin. Because this class of pollutant bioconcentrates up the food chain, the effect is pronounced in top marine predators such as orcas and toothed whales.

== Hair cell signal adaptation ==
Calcium ion influx plays an important role for the hair cells to adapt to the amplification of the signal. This allows humans to ignore constant sounds that are no longer new and allow us to be acute to other changes in our surrounding. The key adaptation mechanism comes from a motor protein myosin-1c that allows slow adaptation, provides tension to sensitize transduction channels, and also participate in signal transduction apparatus. More recent research now shows that the calcium-sensitive binding of calmodulin to myosin-1c could actually modulate the interaction of the adaptation motor with other components of the transduction apparatus as well.

Fast Adaptation: During fast adaptation, Ca^{2+} ions that enter a stereocilium through an open MET channel bind rapidly to a site on or near the channel and induce channel closure. When channels close, tension increases in the tip link, pulling the bundle in the opposite direction. Fast adaptation is more prominent in sound and auditory detecting hair cells, rather in vestibular cells.

Slow Adaption: The dominating model suggests that slow adaptation occurs when myosin-1c slides down the stereocilium in response to elevated tension during bundle displacement. The resultant decreased tension in the tip link permits the bundle to move farther in the opposite direction. As tension decreases, channels close, producing the decline in transduction current. Slow adaptation is most prominent in vestibular hair cells that sense spatial movement and less in cochlear hair cells that detect auditory signals.

== Neural connection ==
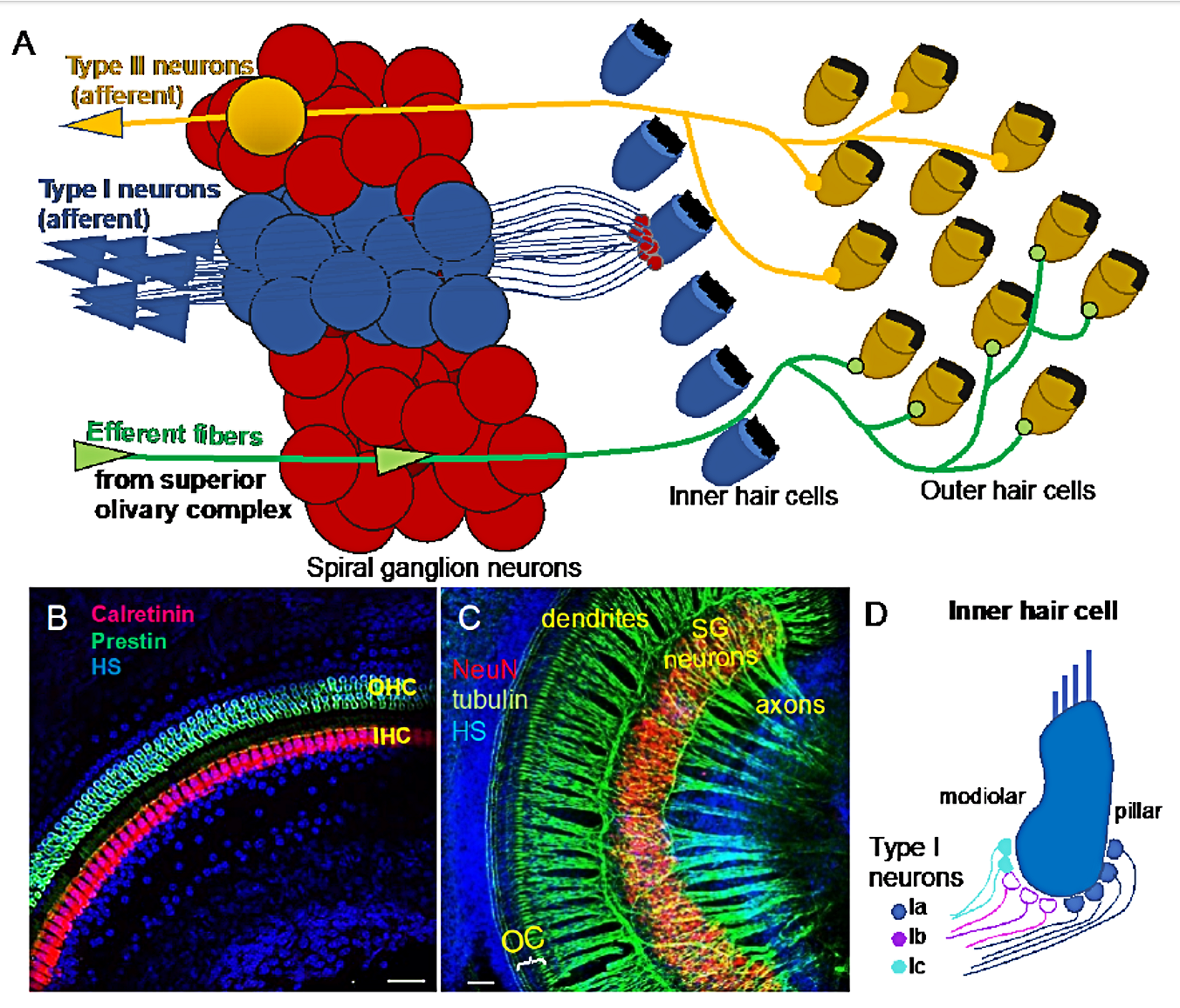
Auditory neurons form the spiral ganglion in the cochlea and connect hair cells in the organ of Corti to cochlear nuclei in the brain stem.

Neurons of the auditory or vestibulocochlear nerve (the eighth cranial nerve) innervate cochlear and vestibular hair cells. The neurotransmitter released by hair cells that stimulates the terminal neurites of peripheral axons of the afferent (towards the brain) neurons is thought to be glutamate. At the presynaptic juncture, there is a distinct presynaptic dense body or ribbon. This dense body is surrounded by synaptic vesicles and is thought to aid in the fast release of neurotransmitter.

Nerve fiber innervation is much denser for inner hair cells than for outer hair cells. A single inner hair cell is innervated by numerous nerve fibers, whereas a single nerve fiber innervates many outer hair cells. Inner hair cell nerve fibers are also very heavily myelinated, which is in contrast to the unmyelinated outer hair cell nerve fibers. The region of the basilar membrane supplying the inputs to a particular afferent nerve fibre can be considered to be its receptive field.

Efferent projections from the brain to the cochlea also play a role in the perception of sound. Efferent synapses occur on outer hair cells and on afferent axons under inner hair cells. The presynaptic terminal bouton is filled with vesicles containing acetylcholine and a neuropeptide called calcitonin gene-related peptide. The effects of these compounds vary; in some hair cells the acetylcholine hyperpolarizes the cell, which reduces the sensitivity of the cochlea locally.

== Regrowth ==
Research on the regrowth of cochlear cells may lead to medical treatments that restore hearing. Unlike birds and fish, humans and other mammals are generally incapable of regrowing the cells of the inner ear that convert sound into neural signals when those cells are damaged by age or disease. Researchers are making progress in gene therapy and stem-cell therapy that may allow the damaged cells to be regenerated. Because hair cells of auditory and vestibular systems in birds and fish have been found to regenerate, their ability has been studied at length. In addition, lateral line hair cells, which have a mechanotransduction function and are found in anamniotes, have been shown to regrow in species such as the zebrafish.

Researchers have identified a mammalian gene that normally acts as a molecular switch to block the regrowth of cochlear hair cells in adults. The Rb1 gene encodes the retinoblastoma protein, which is a tumor suppressor. Rb stops cells from dividing by encouraging their exit from the cell cycle. Not only do hair cells in a culture dish regenerate when the Rb1 gene is deleted, but mice bred to be missing the gene grow more hair cells than control mice that have the gene. Additionally, the sonic hedgehog protein has been shown to block activity of the retinoblastoma protein, thereby inducing cell cycle re-entry and the regrowth of new cells.

Several Notch signaling pathway inhibitors, including the gamma secretase inhibitor LY3056480, are being studied for their potential ability to regenerate hair cells in the cochlea.

TBX2 (T-box transcription factor 2) has been shown to be a master regulator in the differentiation of inner and outer hair cells. This discovery has allowed researchers to direct hair cells to develop into either inner or outer hair cells, which could help in replacing hair cells that have died and prevent or reverse hearing loss.

The cell cycle inhibitor p27^{Kip1} (CDKN1B) has also been found to encourage regrowth of cochlear hair cells in mice following genetic deletion or knock down with siRNA targeting p27. Research on hair cell regeneration may bring us closer to clinical treatment for human hearing loss caused by hair cell damage or death.

== See also ==
- List of distinct cell types in the adult human body

== Additional images ==
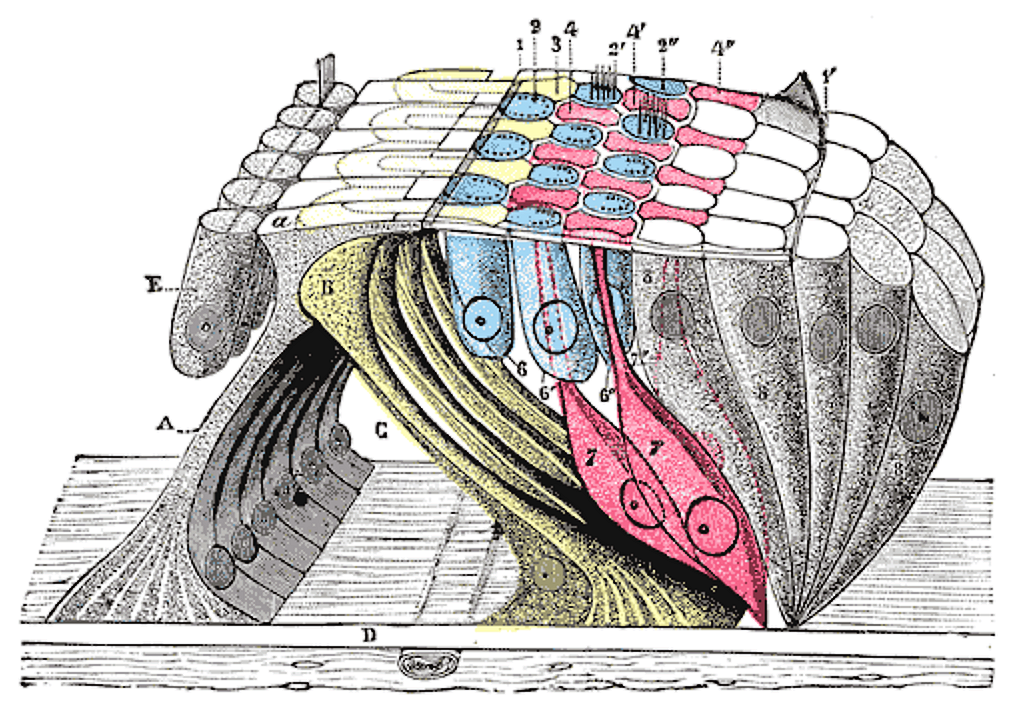
The lamina reticularis and subjacent structures.

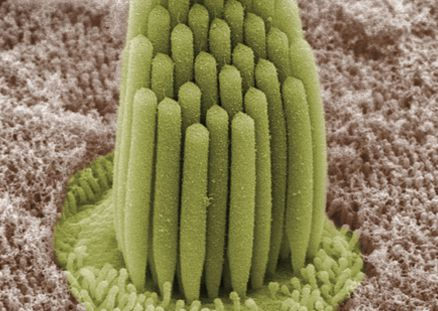
Stereocilia of frog inner ear

== Bibliography ==
- Coffin A, Kelley M, Manley GA, Popper AN (2004). "Evolution of sensory hair cells". In Manley, et al. (eds.). Evolution of the Vertebrate Auditory System. pp. 55–94.
- Fettiplace R, Hackney CM (2006). "The sensory and motor roles of auditory hair cells". Nature Reviews. Neuroscience. 7 (1): 19–29. doi:10.1038/nrn1828. PMID 16371947. S2CID 10155096.
- Kandel ER, Schwartz JH, Jessell TM (2000). Principles of Neural Science (4th ed.). New York: McGraw-Hill. pp. 590–594. ISBN 0-8385-7701-6.
- Manley GA, Popper AN, Fay RR (2004). Evolution of the Vertebrate Auditory System. New York: Springer-Verlag. ISBN 0-387-21093-8.
- Manley GA (2004). "Advances and perspectives in the study of the evolution of the vertebrate auditory system". In Manley, et al. (eds.). Evolution of the Vertebrate Auditory System. pp. 360–368.
- Rabbitt RD, Boyle R, Highstein SM (1–5 February 2010). "Mechanical amplification by hair cells in the semicircular canals". Proceedings of the National Academy of Sciences. 107 (8): 3864–3869. Bibcode:2010PNAS..107.3864R. doi:10.1073/pnas.0906765107. PMC 2840494. PMID 20133682.
  - "Built-in amps: How subtle head motions, quiet sounds are reported to the brain". Medical Xpress. February 9, 2010.
- Breneman KD, Brownell WE, Rabbitt RD (22 April 2009). Brezina V (ed.). "Hair cell bundles: flexoelectric motors of the inner ear". PLOS ONE. 4 (4) e5201. Bibcode:2009PLoSO...4.5201B. doi:10.1371/journal.pone.0005201. PMC 2668172. PMID 19384413.
  - "Power steering for your hearing: Ears have tiny 'flexoelectric' motors to amplify sound". Phys.org (Press release). April 22, 2009.
