= Eyes absent homolog 1 =

Protein-coding gene in the species Homo sapiens

EYA1

Identifiers
- Aliases: EYA1, BOP, BOR, BOS1, OFC1, EYA transcriptional coactivator and phosphatase 1
- External IDs: OMIM: 601653; MGI: 109344; GeneCards: EYA1
Enzyme activity
| EC # | BRENDA | ExPASy | KEGG | MetaCyc |
|---|---|---|---|---|
| 3.1.3.16 | ↗ | ↗ | ↗ | ↗ |
| 3.1.3.48 | ↗ | ↗ | ↗ | ↗ |

Gene location (Human)
| Chr. | Chromosome 8 (human) |
| Band | 8q13.3 | Start | 71,197,433 bp |
| Band | 8q13.3 | End | 71,592,025 bp |

Gene location (Mouse)
| Chr. | Chromosome 1 (mouse) |
| Band | 1 A3|1 4.31 cM | Start | 14,239,178 bp |
| Band | 1 A3|1 4.31 cM | End | 14,380,459 bp |
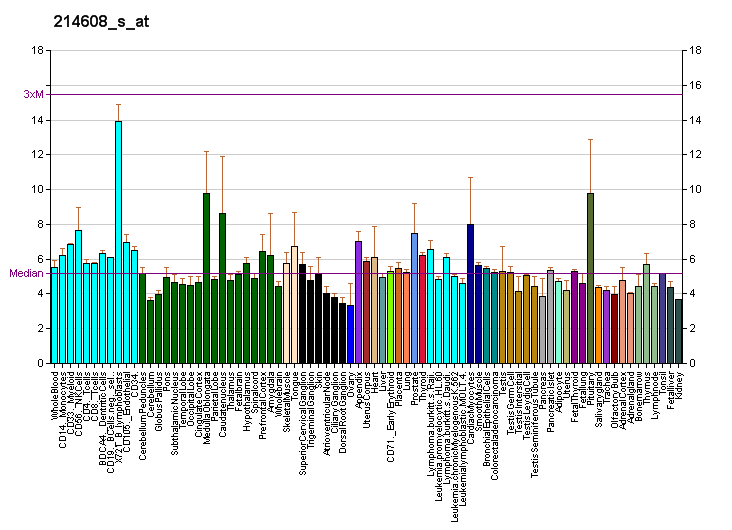
RNA expression pattern
| Bgee | Human / Mouse (ortholog); Top expressed in: Epithelium of choroid plexus; urethra; mucosa of paranasal sinus; olfactory zone of nasal mucosa; putamen; pituitary gland; bronchial epithelial cell; caudate nucleus; anterior pituitary; periodontal fiber / Top expressed in: vestibular sensory epithelium; genital tubercle; iris; maxillary prominence; ciliary body; vestibular membrane of cochlear duct; vas deferens; nose; olfactory epithelium; nasal placode; More reference expression data |
| BioGPS | More reference expression data |
Gene ontology
| Molecular function | phosphoprotein phosphatase activity; metal ion binding; protein binding; RNA binding; protein tyrosine phosphatase activity; hydrolase activity |
| Cellular component | cytoplasm; protein-DNA complex; nucleus; nucleoplasm; nuclear body; protein-containing complex |
| Biological process | pattern specification process; response to ionizing radiation; regulation of neuron differentiation; embryonic skeletal system morphogenesis; ureteric bud development; cell fate commitment; striated muscle tissue development; semicircular canal morphogenesis; regulation of transcription, DNA-templated; anatomical structure development; positive regulation of epithelial cell proliferation; neuron fate specification; anatomical structure morphogenesis; positive regulation of DNA repair; protein dephosphorylation; outflow tract morphogenesis; otic vesicle morphogenesis; outer ear morphogenesis; hearing; aorta morphogenesis; protein sumoylation; transcription, DNA-templated; otic vesicle development; cellular response to DNA damage stimulus; multicellular organism development; ear morphogenesis; positive regulation of transcription, DNA-templated; branching involved in ureteric bud morphogenesis; cochlea morphogenesis; inner ear morphogenesis; middle ear morphogenesis; animal organ morphogenesis; positive regulation of secondary heart field cardioblast proliferation; peptidyl-tyrosine dephosphorylation; metanephros development; mesodermal cell fate specification; positive regulation of transcription by RNA polymerase II; pharyngeal system development; negative regulation of extrinsic apoptotic signaling pathway in absence of ligand; double-strand break repair; DNA repair; cell differentiation; chromatin organization |
Sources:Amigo / QuickGO
Orthologs
| Databases | NCBI: entry; OMA: entry |
| Species | Human | Mouse |
| Entrez | 2138 | 14048 |
| Ensembl | ENSG00000104313 | ENSMUSG00000025932 |
| UniProt | Q99502 | P97767 |
| RefSeq (mRNA) | NM_000503; NM_001288574; NM_001288575; NM_172058; NM_172059 NM_172060; NM_001370333; NM_001370334; NM_001370335; NM_001370336 | NM_001252192; NM_010164; NM_001310459 |
| RefSeq (protein) | NP_000494; NP_001275503; NP_001275504; NP_742055; NP_742056 NP_001357262; NP_001357263; NP_001357264; NP_001357265 | NP_001239121; NP_001297388; NP_034294; NP_001389588; NP_001389589 NP_001389590; NP_001389591 |
| Location (UCSC) | Chr 8: 71.2 – 71.59 Mb | Chr 1: 14.24 – 14.38 Mb |
| PubMed search |
- Wikidata
| View/Edit Human | View/Edit Mouse |

Eyes absent homolog 1 is a protein that in humans is encoded by the EYA1 gene.

This gene encodes a member of the eyes absent (EYA) subfamily of proteins. The encoded protein may play a role in the developing kidney, branchial arches, eye, and ear. Mutations of this gene have been associated with branchiootorenal dysplasia syndrome, branchiootic syndrome, and sporadic cases of congenital cataracts and ocular anterior segment anomalies. A similar protein in mice can act as a transcriptional activator. Four transcript variants encoding three distinct isoforms have been identified for this gene.

== Interactions ==
EYA1 has been shown to interact with SIX1.
