= Organ of Corti =

Receptor organ for hearing

- A cross section of the cochlea illustrating the organ of Corti

Details
- Part of: Cochlea of the inner ear

Identifiers
- Latin: organum spirale
- MeSH: D009925
- NeuroLex ID: birnlex_2526
- TA98: A15.3.03.121
- TA2: 7035
- FMA: 75715

In anatomy and physiology, the organ of Corti or spiral organ is the receptor organ for hearing, located in the cochlea of mammals. Structurally, the organ consists of a highly varied strip of epithelial cells, capable of transducing sensations of physical movement in the inner ear into neural encoding of sound. This process begins when external sound waves causes structures in the inner ear to vibrate, leading to the displacement of cochlear fluid and causing the movement of individual hair cells at the organ of Corti; hair cells in turn produce action potentials, which are electrochemical signals used by the nervous system.

Italian anatomist Alfonso Giacomo Gaspare Corti (1822–1876) discovered the organ of Corti in 1851. The structure evolved from the basilar papilla and is crucial for mechanotransduction in mammals.

== Structure ==
Cross-section through the spiral organ of Corti at greater magnification, showing position of the hair cells on the basement membrane.

The organ of Corti is located in the scala media of the cochlea of the inner ear between the vestibular duct and the tympanic duct and is composed of mechanosensory cells, known as hair cells. Strategically positioned on the basilar membrane of the organ of Corti are three rows of outer hair cells (OHCs) and one row of inner hair cells (IHCs). Surrounding these hair cells are supporting cells: Deiters cells, also called phalangeal cells, which have a close relation with the OHCs, and pillar cells, which separate and support both the OHCs and the IHCs.

Projecting from the tops of the hair cells are tiny finger-like projections called stereocilia, which are arranged in a graduated fashion with the shortest stereocilia on the outer rows and the longest in the center. This gradation is thought to be the most important anatomic feature of the organ of Corti because this allows the sensory cells superior tuning capability.

If the cochlea were uncoiled, it would roll out to be about 33 mm long in women and 34 mm in men, with about 2.28 mm of standard deviation for the population. The cochlea is also tonotopically organized, meaning that different frequencies of sound waves interact with different locations on the structure. The base of the cochlea, closest to the outer ear, is the most stiff and narrow and is where the high-frequency sounds are transduced. The apex, or top, of the cochlea is wider and much more flexible and loose and functions as the transduction site for low-frequency sounds.

== Function ==
Image showing the outer ear, middle ear, and inner ear, and how sound is conducted through the outer ear, to the ossicles of the middle ear, through to the inner ear and the cochlea, where the organ of Corti sits.

The function of the organ of Corti is to convert (transduce) sounds into electrical signals that can be transmitted to the brainstem through the auditory nerve. It is the auricle and middle ear that act as mechanical transformers and amplifiers so that the sound waves end up with amplitudes 22 times greater than when they entered the ear.

=== Auditory transduction ===
In normal hearing, the majority of the auditory signals that reach the organ of Corti in the first place come from the outer ear. Sound waves enter through the auditory canal and vibrate the tympanic membrane, also known as the eardrum, which vibrates three small bones called the ossicles. As a result, the attached oval window moves and causes movement of the round window, which leads to displacement of the cochlear fluid. However, the stimulation can happen also via direct vibration of the cochlea from the skull. The latter is referred to as Bone Conduction (or BC) hearing, as complementary to the first one described, which is instead called Air Conduction (or AC) hearing. Both AC and BC stimulate the basilar membrane in the same way (Békésy, G.v., Experiments in Hearing. 1960).

The basilar membrane on the tympanic duct presses against the hair cells of the organ as perilymphatic pressure waves pass. The stereocilia atop the IHCs move with this fluid displacement and in response their cation, or positive ion selective, channels are pulled open by cadherin structures called tip links that connect adjacent stereocilia. The organ of Corti, surrounded in potassium-rich fluid endolymph, lies on the basilar membrane at the base of the scala media. Under the organ of Corti is the scala tympani and above it, the scala vestibuli. Both structures exist in a low potassium fluid called perilymph. Because those stereocilia are in the midst of a high concentration of potassium, once their cation channels are pulled open, potassium ions as well as calcium ions flow into the top of the hair cell. With this influx of positive ions the IHC becomes depolarized, opening voltage-gated calcium channels at the basolateral region of the hair cells and triggering the release of the neurotransmitter glutamate. An electrical signal is then sent through the auditory nerve and into the auditory cortex of the brain as a neural message.

=== Cochlear amplification ===
The organ of Corti is also capable of modulating the auditory signal. The outer hair cells (OHCs) can amplify the signal through a process called electromotility where they increase movement of the basilar and tectorial membranes and therefore increase deflection of stereocilia in the IHCs.

A crucial piece to this cochlear amplification is the motor protein prestin, which changes shape based on the voltage potential inside of the hair cell. When the cell is depolarized, prestin shortens, and because it is located on the membrane of OHCs it then pulls on the basilar membrane and increasing how much the membrane is deflected, creating a more intense effect on the inner hair cells (IHCs). When the cell hyperpolarizes prestin lengthens and eases tension on the IHCs, which decreases the neural impulses to the brain. In this way, the hair cell itself is able to modify the auditory signal before it even reaches the brain.

== Development ==
The organ of Corti, in between the scala tympani and the scala media, develops after the formation and growth of the cochlear duct. The inner and outer hair cells then differentiate into their appropriate positions and are followed by the organization of the supporting cells. The topology of the supporting cells lends itself to the actual mechanical properties that are needed for the highly specialized sound-induced movements within the organ of Corti.

Development and growth of the organ of Corti relies on specific genes, many of which have been identified in previous research (SOX2, GATA3, EYA1, FOXG1, BMP4, RAC1, and more), to undergo such differentiation. Specifically, the cochlear duct growth and the formation of hair cells within the organ of Corti.

Mutations in the genes expressed in or near the organ of Corti before the differentiation of hair cells will result in a disruption in the differentiation, and potential malfunction of, the organ of Corti.

== Clinical significance ==
=== Hearing loss ===
The organ of Corti can be damaged by excessive sound levels, leading to noise-induced impairment.

The most common kind of hearing impairment, sensorineural hearing loss, includes as one major cause the reduction of function in the organ of Corti. Specifically, the active amplification function of the outer hair cells is very sensitive to damage from exposure to trauma from overly-loud sounds or to certain ototoxic drugs. Once outer hair cells are damaged, they do not regenerate, and the result is a loss of sensitivity and an abnormally large growth of loudness (known as recruitment) in the part of the spectrum that the damaged cells serve.

While hearing loss has always been considered irreversible in mammals, fish and birds routinely repair such damage. A 2013 study has shown that the use of particular drugs may reactivate genes normally expressed only during hair cell development. The research was carried out at Harvard Medical School, Massachusetts Eye and Ear, and the Keio University School of Medicine in Japan.

== Additional images ==
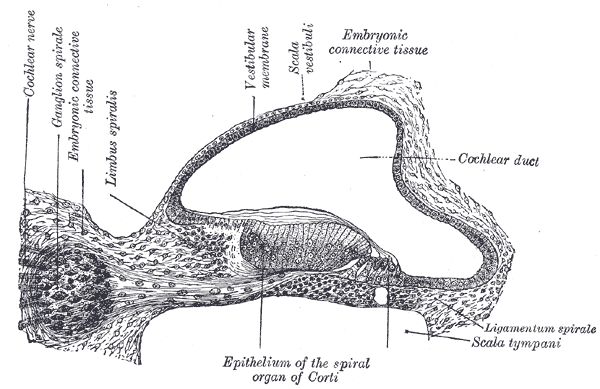
Transverse section of the cochlear duct of a fetal cat.

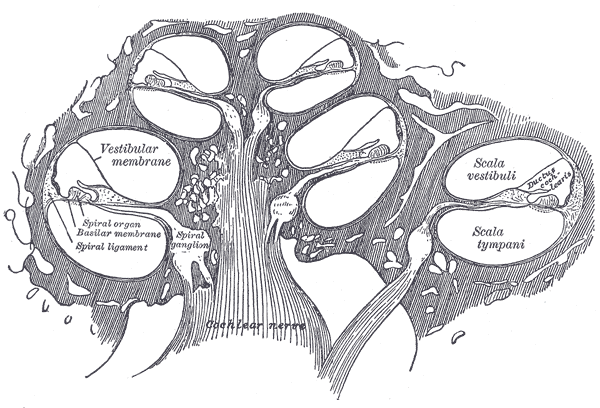
Diagrammatic longitudinal section of the cochlea

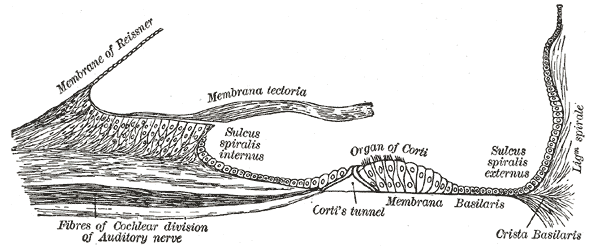
Floor of ductus cochlearis

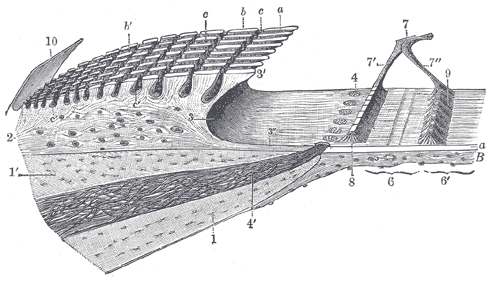
Limbus laminæ spiralis and membrana basilaris

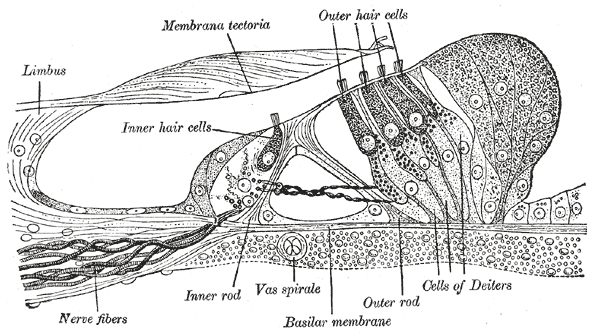
Section through the spiral organ of Corti (magnified)

== See also ==
- Hearing
- Inner ear
- List of distinct cell types in the adult human body
