= Tectorial membrane =

Extracellular matrix in the inner ear

Tectorial membrane (cochlea)
- Section through the spiral organ of Corti. (Membrana tectoria labeled at center top.)

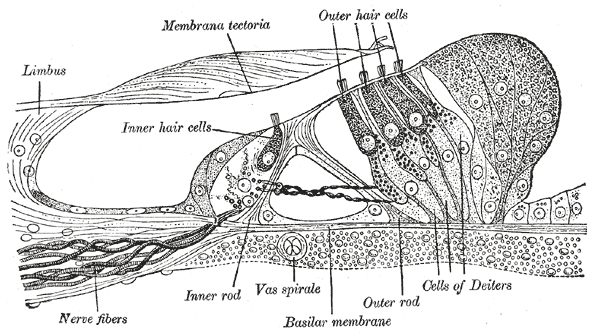
- Section through the spiral organ of Corti. (Membrana tectoria labeled at center top.)

Details

Identifiers
- Latin: membrana tectoria ductus cochlearis
- MeSH: D013680
- NeuroLex ID: birnlex_2531
- TA98: A15.3.03.108
- TA2: 7034
- FMA: 75805

The tectoria membrane (TM) is one of two acellular membranes in the cochlea of the inner ear, the other being the basilar membrane (BM). "Tectorial" in anatomy means forming a cover. The TM is located above the spiral limbus and the spiral organ of Corti and extends along the longitudinal length of the cochlea parallel to the BM. Radially the TM is divided into three zones, the limbal, middle and marginal zones. Of these the limbal zone is the thinnest (transversally) and overlies the auditory teeth of Huschke with its inside edge attached to the spiral limbus. The marginal zone is the thickest (transversally) and is divided from the middle zone by Hensen's Stripe. It overlies the sensory inner hair cells and electrically-motile outer hair cells of the organ of Corti and during acoustic stimulation stimulates the inner hair cells through fluid coupling, and the outer hair cells via direct connection to their tallest stereocilia.

== Structure ==
The TM is a gel-like structure containing 97% water. Its dry weight is composed of collagen (50%), non-collagenous glycoproteins (25%) and proteoglycans (25%). Three inner-ear specific glycoproteins are expressed in the TM, α-tectorin, β-tectorin and otogelin. Of these proteins α-tectorin and β-tectorin form the striated sheet matrix that regularly organises the collagen fibres. Due to the increased structural complexity of the TM relative to other acellular gels (such as the otolithic membranes), its mechanical properties are consequently significantly more complex. They have been experimentally shown to be radially and longitudinally anisotropic and to exhibit viscoelastic properties.

== Function ==
The mechanical role of the tectorial membrane in hearing is yet to be fully understood, and traditionally was neglected or downplayed in many models of the cochlea. However, recent genetic , mechanical and mathematical studies have highlighted the importance of the TM for healthy auditory function in mammals. Mice that lack expression of individual glycoproteins exhibit hearing abnormalities, including, most notably, enhanced frequency selectivity in Tecb^{−/−} mice, which lack expression of β-tectorin. In vitro investigations of the mechanical properties of the TM have demonstrated the ability of isolated sections of TM to support travelling waves at acoustically relevant frequencies. This raises the possibility that the TM may be involved in the longitudinal propagation of energy in the intact cochlea. MIT research correlates the TM with the ability of the human ear to hear faint noises.

The TM influences inner ear sensory cells by storing calcium ions. When calcium store is depleted by loud sounds or by the introduction of calcium chelators, the responses of the sensory cells decrease. When tectorial membrane calcium is restored, sensory cell function returns.

== Additional images ==
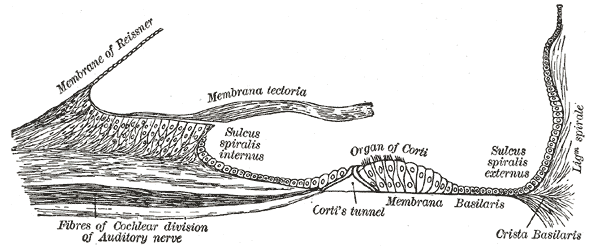
Floor of ductus cochlearis.

Cross section of the cochlea.
