= Cochlear duct =

Cavity in the cochlea of the inner ear

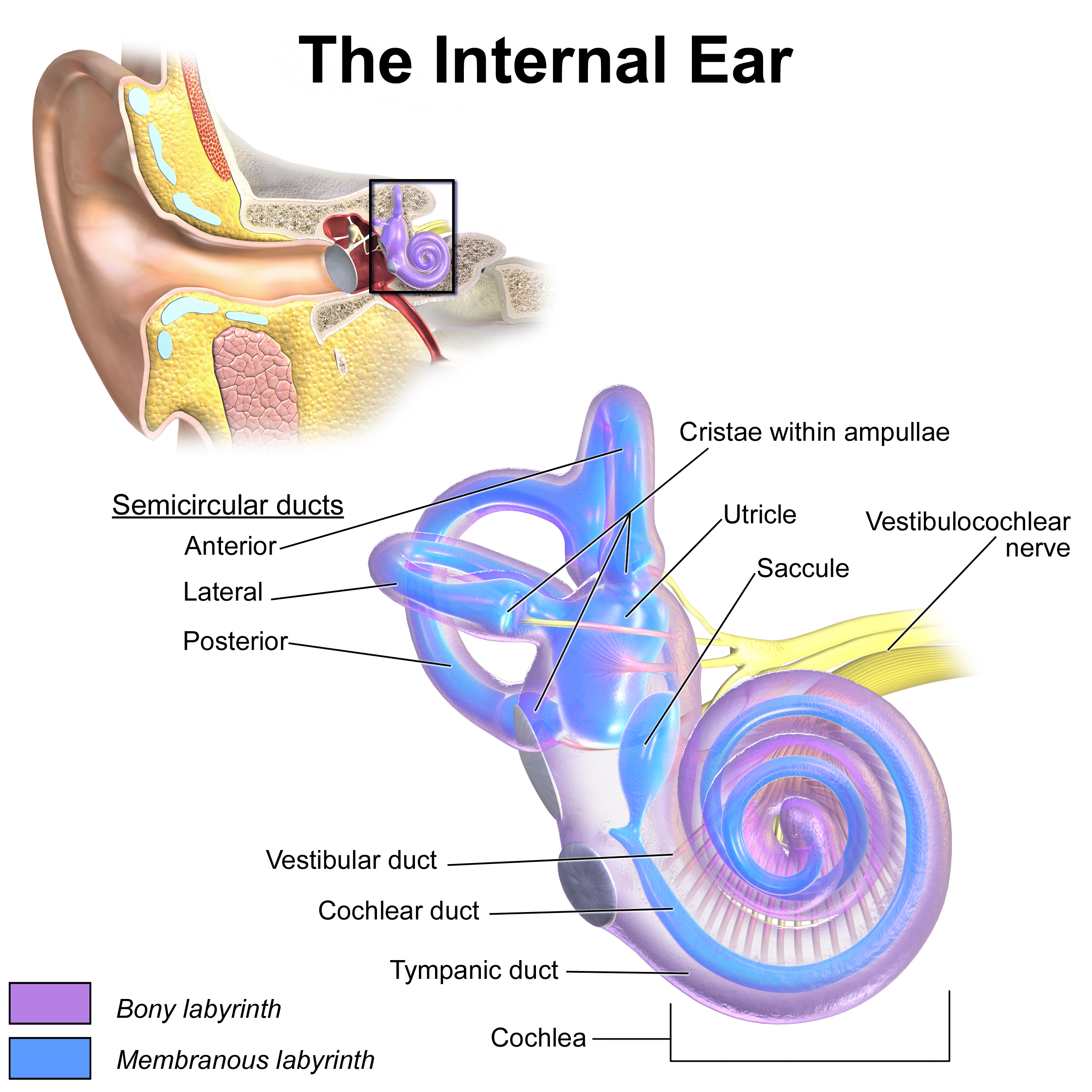
- Inner ear, with cochlear duct labeled near bottom.

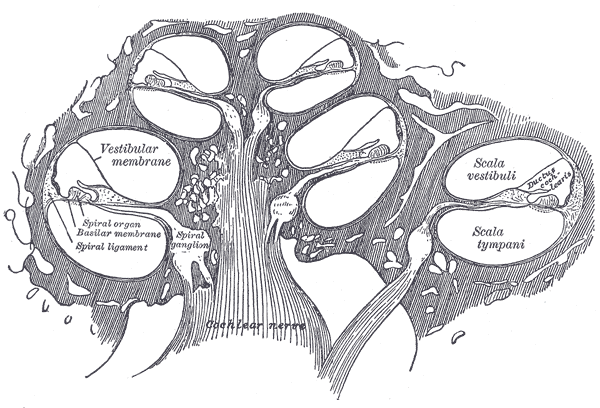
- Diagrammatic longitudinal section of the cochlea. (visible at far right under latin name ductus cochlearis)

Details
- System: Ear

Identifiers
- Latin: ductus cochlearis
- MeSH: D003053
- NeuroLex ID: birnlex_2562
- TA98: A15.3.03.093; A15.3.03.092
- TA2: 7022
- FMA: 79789 61119, 79789

The cochlear duct (a.k.a. the scala media) is an endolymph filled cavity inside the cochlea, located between the tympanic duct and the vestibular duct, separated by the basilar membrane and the vestibular membrane (Reissner's membrane) respectively. The cochlear duct houses the organ of Corti.

== Structure ==
The cochlear duct is part of the cochlea. It is separated from the tympanic duct (scala tympani) by the basilar membrane. It is separated from the vestibular duct (scala vestibuli) by the vestibular membrane (Reissner's membrane). The stria vascularis is located in the wall of the cochlear duct.

=== Development ===
The cochlear duct develops from the ventral otic vesicle (otocyst). It grows slightly flattened between the middle and outside of the body. This development may be regulated by the genes EYA1, SIX1, GATA3, and TBX1. The organ of Corti develops inside the cochlear duct.

== Function ==
The cochlear duct contains the organ of Corti. This is attached to the basilar membrane. It also contains endolymph, which contains high concentrations of K^{+} for the function of inner hair cells and outer hair cells in the organ of Corti.

== Clinical significance ==
Drugs delivered directly to the tympanic duct will spread to all of the cochlea except for the cochlear duct. Rarely, the cochlear duct may develop to have the wrong shape.

== Additional images ==
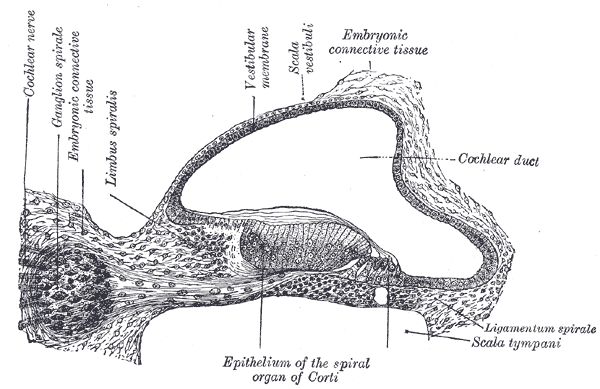
Transverse section of the cochlear duct of a fetal cat.

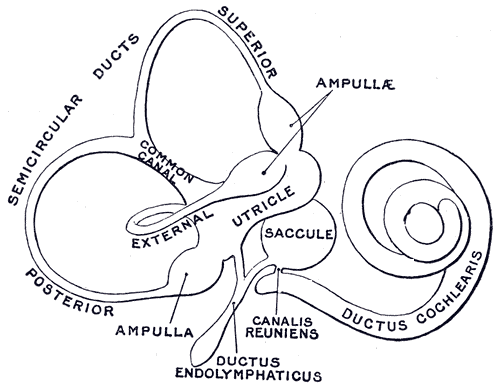
The membranous labyrinth.

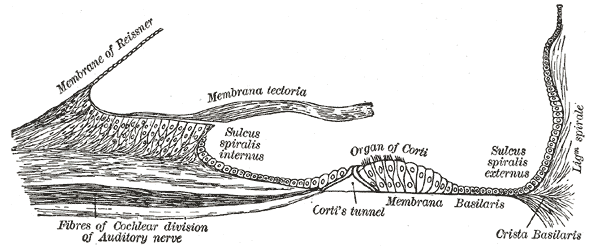
Floor of ductus cochlearis.

Cross section of the cochlea.
