= Vestibular duct =

Space through which sound is transmitted

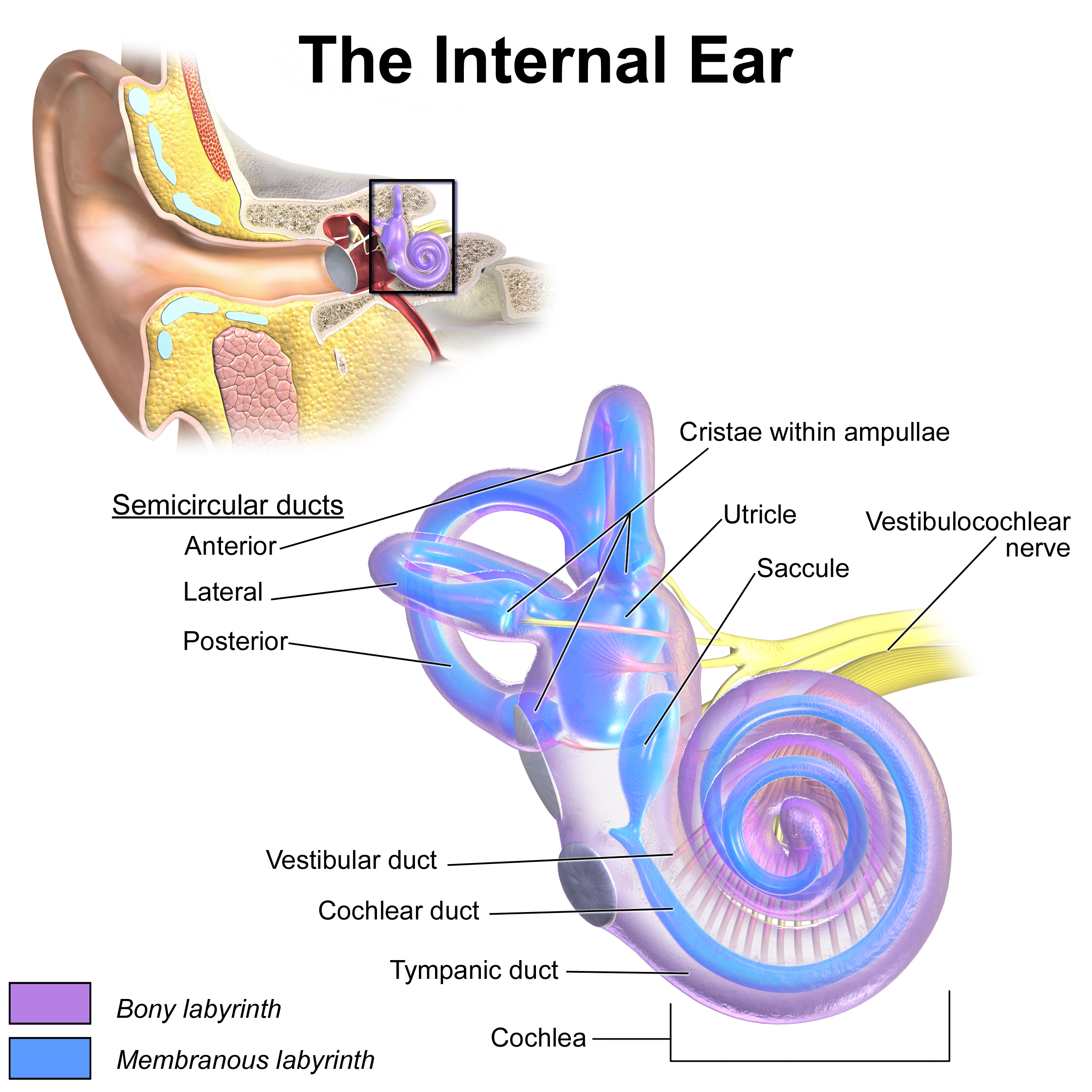
- Inner ear, with vestibular duct labeled near bottom.

- Cross section of the cochlea.

Details

Identifiers
- Latin: scala vestibuli
- MeSH: D054738
- TA98: A15.3.03.043
- TA2: 6968
- FMA: 61269

The vestibular duct or scala vestibuli is a perilymph-filled cavity inside the cochlea of the inner ear that conducts sound vibrations to the cochlear duct.

It is separated from the cochlear duct by Reissner's membrane and extends from the vestibule of the ear to the helicotrema where it joins the tympanic duct.

== Additional images ==
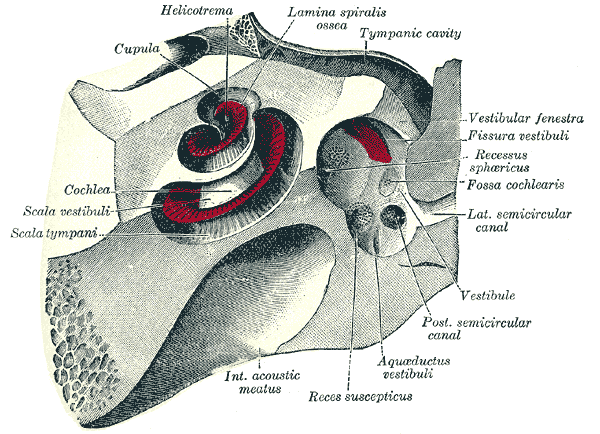
The cochlea and vestibule, viewed from above.

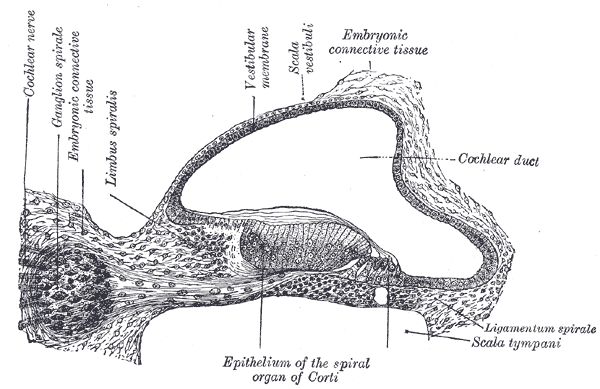
Transverse section of the cochlear duct of a fetal cat.

Interior of right osseous labyrinth.

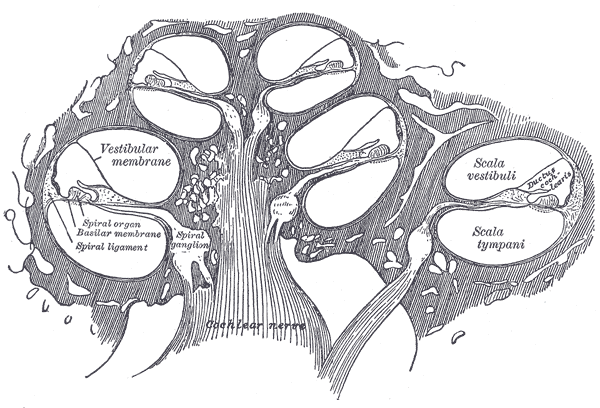
Diagrammatic longitudinal section of the cochlea.

== See also ==
- Tympanic duct

== internal websites ==
- Slide from University of Kansas
- Diagram at Indiana University – Purdue University Indianapolis
- Image at University of New England (United States)
