= Stereocilia (inner ear) =

Mechanosensing organelles of hair cells

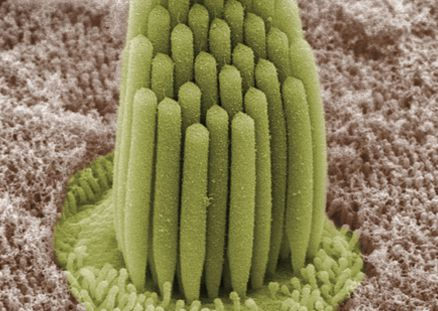
Stereocilia of a frog's inner ear.

In the inner ear, stereocilia are the mechanosensing organelles of hair cells, which respond to fluid motion in numerous types of animals for various functions, including hearing and balance. They are about 10–50 micrometers in length and share some similar features of microvilli. The hair cells transduces fluid pressure and other mechanical stimuli into electric stimuli via the many microvilli that make up stereocilia rods. Stereocilia exist in the auditory and vestibular systems.

== Morphology ==
Resembling hairlike projections, the stereocilia are arranged in bundles of 30–300. Within the bundles, the stereocilia are often lined up in several rows of increasing height, similar to a staircase. At the core of these hairlike stereocilia are rigid cross-linked actin filaments, which can renew every 48 hours. These actin filaments face their positive ends at the tips of the stereocilia and their negative ends at the base and can be up to 120 micrometers in length. Filamentous structures, called tip links, connect the tips of stereocilia in adjacent rows in the bundles. The tip links are made up of nearly vertical fine filaments that run upward from the top end of a shorter stereocilia to its taller neighbor. Tip links are analogous to tiny springs, which, when stretched, open cation-selective channels, thus allowing ions to flow across the cell membrane into the hair cells. They also are involved in the force transmission across the bundle and the maintenance of the hair bundle structure.

== Auditory pathway ==
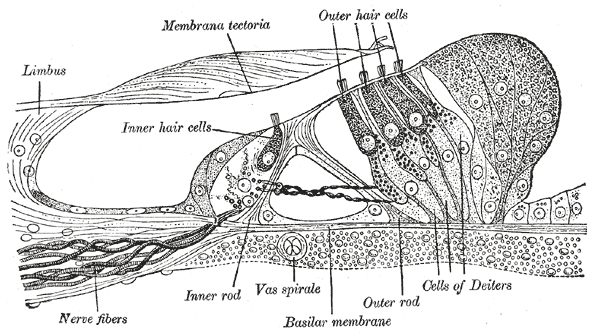
Section through the spiral organ of Corti, magnified. The stereocilia are the "hairs" sticking out of the tops of the inner and outer hair cells.

As acoustic sensors in mammals, stereocilia are lined up in the organ of Corti within the cochlea of the inner ear. In hearing, stereocilia transform the mechanical energy of sound waves into electrical signals for the hair cells, which ultimately leads to an excitation of the auditory nerve. Stereocilia are composed of cytoplasm with embedded bundles of cross-linked actin filaments. The actin filaments anchor to the terminal web and the top of the cell membrane and are arranged in grade of height. As sound waves propagate in the cochlea, the movement of endolymph fluid bends the stereocilia. If the direction of movement is towards the taller stereocilia, tension develops in the tip links, mechanically opening transduction channels near the tips. Cations from the endolymph flow into the cell, depolarizing the hair cell and triggering the release of neurotransmitters to nearby nerves, which send an electrical signal to the central nervous system.

== Vestibular pathway ==
In the vestibular system, the stereocilia are located in the otolithic organs and the semicircular canals. Hair cells in the vestibular system are slightly different from those in the auditory system in that vestibular hair cells have one tallest cilium, termed the kinocilium. Bending the stereocilia toward the kinocilium depolarizes the cell and results in increased afferent activity. Bending the stereocilia away from the kinocilium hyperpolarizes the cell and results in a decrease in afferent activity. In the semicircular canals, the hair cells are found in the crista ampullaris and the stereocilia protrude into the ampullary cupula. Here, the stereocilia are all oriented in the same direction. In the otoliths, the hair cells are topped by small calcium carbonate crystals called otoconia. Unlike the semicircular ducts, the kinocilia of hair cells in the otoliths are not oriented in a consistent direction. The kinocilia point toward (in the utricle) or away from (in the saccule) a middle line called the striola.

== Mechanoelectrical transduction ==
In the cochlea, a shearing movement between the tectorial membrane and the basilar membrane deflects the stereocilia, affecting the tension on the tip link filaments, which then open and close the non-specific ion channels. When tension increases, the flow of ions across the membrane into the hair cell rises as well. Such influx of ions causes a depolarization of the cell, resulting in an electrical potential that ultimately leads to a signal for the auditory nerve and the brain. The identity of the mechanosensitive channels in the stereocilia is still unknown.

The transduction channels associated with stereocilia are thought to lie at the distal ends of the stereocilia. Deflections of the stereocilia in the direction of the tallest stereocilia lead to an increased rate of opening of nonspecific cation channels. This, in turn, causes receptor depolarization and leads to the excitement of the cochlear nerve afferents that are located at the base of the hair cell. Deflections of the stereocilia in the opposite direction toward the shortest stereocilia cause transduction channels to close. In this situation, the hair cells become hyperpolarized and the nerve afferents are not excited.

There are two different types of fluid that surround the hair cells of the inner ear. The endolymph is the fluid that surrounds the apical surfaces of hair cells. Potassium is the major cation in the endolymph and is thought to be responsible for carrying the receptor currents in the cochlea. Perilymph is found surrounding the sides and the bases of the hair cells. Perilymph is low in potassium and high in sodium. The different ionic makeups of the surrounding fluid in addition to the resting potential of the hair cell create a potential difference across the apical membrane of the hair cell, so potassium enters when transduction channels open. An influx of potassium ions depolarizes the cell and causes the release of a neurotransmitter that can initiate nerve impulses in the sensory neurons that synapse on the base of the hair cell.

== Destruction of stereocilia ==
Stereocilia (along with the entirety of the hair cell) in mammals can be damaged or destroyed by excessive loud noises, disease, medications, as well as toxins and are not regenerable. Environmental noise induced hearing impairment is probably the most prevalent noise health effect according to the U.S. Environmental Protection Agency. Abnormal structure/organization of a bundle of stereocilia can also cause deafness and in turn create balance problems for an individual. In other vertebrates, if the hair cell is harmed, supporting cells will divide and replace the damaged hair cells.

== Genetic studies ==
The methionine sulfoxide reductase B3 gene (MsrB3), a protein repair enzyme, has been implicated in large scale stereocilia bundle degeneration, as well as many other factors such as gestational age and tolerance to cold environments in plants. Although the exact process of pathogenesis is unknown, it seems to be related to apoptotic cell death. A study based on splicing morpholinos to down-regulate MsrB3 expression in zebrafish showed shorter, thinner, and more crowded cilia, as well as small, misplaced otoliths. Several stereocilia also underwent apoptosis. Injection with wild-type MsrB3 mRNA rescued auditory deficits, suggesting MsrB3 helps prevent apoptosis.

Another gene, DFNB74, has been observed as a gene involved in recessive hearing loss. DFNB74 based hearing loss may be related to mitochondrial dysfunction. DFNB74 and MsrB3 based deafness may be related to one another. Research on these genes is based on families with recessive deafness, and multiple nonrelated families with this deafness have mutations on both DFNB74 and MsrB3.

Damaged or abnormal stereocilia that are a result of genetic mutations often cause hearing loss and other complications, and can be passed down to children. In a recent study, researchers studied mice that inherited a mutated hair cell gene called whirlin, which leads to shorter and fatter stereocilia that are organized in additional rows and that often die off after birth. No current therapies or reparative measures exist to replace such defective hair cells in humans. In order to correct this mutation, researchers injected a gene therapy containing the corrected gene into the inner ear of mice with the genetic mutation. The therapy restored stereocilia to normal lengths and eliminated the additional rows of stereocilia in newborn whirler mice. Despite the restoration of hair cells, the treated whirler mice exhibited no signs of improved hearing ability following testing after one month and after three months of treatment. Further studies are looking to understand why the restoration of the stereocilia did not improve the hearing ability of the mutated mice.

== Current research ==
Sound above a certain decibel level can cause permanent damage to inner ear stereocilia. New research has shown that the damage can possibly be reversed if we can repair or re-create some of the proteins in the stereocilia. In this study, scientists used zebrafish to examine the motion of proteins within live ear cells using a confocal microscope. This has shown that proteins in stereocilia move quickly, indicating that the movement of the proteins within the hair cells may be a very important factor in maintaining the integrity of the hair bundles in the inner ear. Further research found that myosin and actin, two proteins important for cell movement, move very quickly. Fascin 2b, a protein involved in actin cross-linking, moves even faster. Constant movement of proteins within cells, along with replacement and readjustment, helps cells repair damage. The fast movement of these proteins has changed our understanding of stereocilia and indicates that proteins within stereocilia are not immobile and static. Further research hopes to investigate manipulating protein dynamics to restore human hearing function after damage.
