= Graveyard spiral =

Spiral dive entered by a pilot due to spatial disorientation

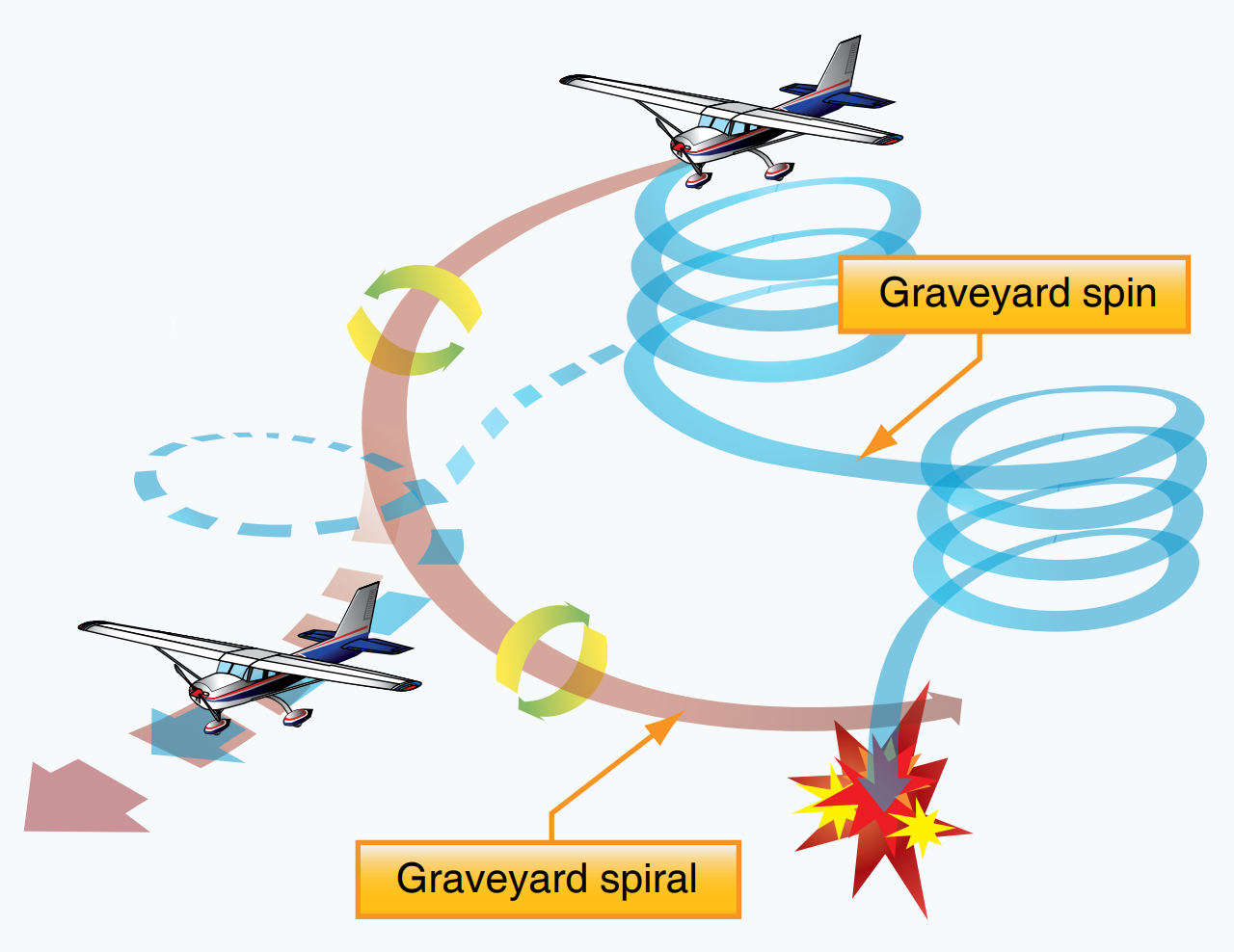
Graveyard spiral

In aviation, a graveyard spiral is a type of dangerous spiral dive entered into accidentally by a pilot who is not trained or not proficient in flying in instrument meteorological conditions (IMC). Other names for this phenomenon include suicide spiral, deadly spiral, death spiral and vicious spiral.

Graveyard spirals are most common at night or in poor weather conditions where no horizon exists to provide visual correction for misleading inner-ear cues. Graveyard spirals are the result of several sensory illusions in aviation which may occur in actual or simulated IMC, when the pilot experiences spatial disorientation and loses awareness of the aircraft's attitude. The pilot loses the ability to judge the orientation of their aircraft due to the brain's misperception of spatial cues.

The graveyard spiral consists of both physiological and physical components. Mechanical failure is often a result, but generally not a causal factor, as it is the pilot's sense of equilibrium which leads to the spiral dive. Flying by "the seat of the pants", and failing to recognize and/or respond to instrument readings, is the most common source of controlled flight into terrain (CFIT), where an airplane controlled by a pilot hits the ground.

== Physics ==
The pilot mistakenly believes they are flying with the wings level, but with a descent indicated on the altimeter and vertical speed indicator. This usually leads to the pilot attempting to climb by pulling back on the control yoke. In a banking turn, however, the airplane is at an angle and will be scribing a large circle in the sky. Pulling back on the control yoke has the effect of tightening that circle and causing the airplane to lose altitude at an increasing rate, like water swirling in a drain or funnel. An increasing component of the lift being generated by the wings is directed sideways by the bank angle, not only pushing the airplane "upward" into the turn, but reducing the amount of lift which is holding the airplane up. At that point the aircraft is describing a descending circle or spiral, with a flight path that again resembles being in a funnel. In the ever-tightening, descending spiral the aircraft eventually exits the base of the clouds and/or hits the ground.

To mitigate this situation, a student pilot or a pilot under instruction practices by using a view-limiting device to learn instrument flying proficiency under the supervision of a flight instructor. Instrument-rated pilots also use view-limiting devices supervised by an instructor or a safety pilot to practise instrument flight and maintain instrument flying proficiency.

== Vestibular aspects ==
The inner ear contains the vestibular system, which is also known as the organ of equilibrium. About the size of a pencil eraser, the vestibular system contains two distinct structures: the semicircular canals, which detect changes in angular acceleration, and the otolith organs (the utricle and the saccule), which detect changes in linear acceleration and gravity. Both the semicircular canals and the otolith organs provide information to the brain regarding the body's position and movement. A connection between the vestibular system and the eyes helps maintain balance and keep the eyes focused on an object while the head is moving or while the body is rotating.

The semicircular canals are three half-circular, interconnected tubes located inside each ear that are the equivalent of three gyroscopes located in three planes perpendicular (at right angles) to each other. Each plane corresponds to the rolling, pitching, or yawing motions of an aircraft. Each canal is filled with a fluid called endolymph and contains a motion sensor with hair-like protrusions whose ends are embedded in a gelatinous structure called the cupula. The cupula and the hairs move as the fluid moves inside the canal in response to an angular acceleration.

The movement of the hairs is similar to the movement of seaweed caused by ocean currents or that of wheat fields moved by wind gusts. When the head is still and the airplane is straight and level, the fluid in the canals does not move and the hairs stand straight up, indicating to the brain that there is no rotational acceleration (a turn). If the pilot turns either the aircraft or their head, the canal moves with the head, but the fluid inside does not move because of its inertia. As the canal moves, the hairs inside also move with it and are bent in the opposite direction of the acceleration by the stationary fluid. This hair movement sends a signal to the brain to indicate that the head has turned. The problem starts when the pilot continues turning their aircraft at a constant rate (as in a coordinated turn) for more than 20 seconds.

In this kind of turn, the fluid inside the canal starts moving initially, then friction causes it to catch up with the walls of the rotating canal. When this happens, the hairs inside the canal will return to their straight up position, sending an erroneous signal to the brain that the turn has stopped, when in fact, the turn continues.

If the pilot then starts rolling out of the turn to go back to level flight, the fluid inside the canal will continue to move (because of its inertia), and the hairs will now move in the opposite direction, sending an erroneous signal to the brain indicating that the aircraft is turning in the opposite direction, when in fact, it is actually slowing down from the original turn.

However, entry to the graveyard spiral is a gradual event, which allows the pilot to mentally adjust to an incorrect standard of feeling level. With no external cues, a pilot who doesn't rely on altitude instruments will believe the wings to be level because the vestibular system is falsely reporting that the force of gravity is acting evenly on the pilot's head.

The graveyard spiral is associated with a return to level flight following an intentional or unintentional prolonged bank turn. For example, a pilot who enters a banking turn to the left will initially have a sensation of a turn in the same direction. If the left turn continues (~20 seconds or more), the pilot will experience the sensation that the airplane is no longer turning to the left. At this point, if the pilot attempts to level the wings this action will produce a sensation that the airplane is turning and banking in the opposite direction (to the right), a sensation commonly known as the leans. If the pilot believes the illusion of a right turn (which can be very compelling), they will re-enter the original left turn in an attempt to counteract the sensation of a right turn. If the pilot fails to recognize the illusion and does not level the wings, the airplane will continue turning left and losing altitude. Because an aircraft tends to lose altitude in turns unless the pilot compensates for the loss in lift, the pilot may notice a loss of altitude. The absence of any sensation of turning creates the illusion of being in a level descent. The pilot may pull back on the controls in an attempt to climb or stop the descent. This action tightens the spiral and increases the loss of altitude.

The solution is for the pilot to consciously override the brain's imperative to judge physical attitude on the basis of signals from the vestibular, and rely solely on the visual cues of horizon or of attitude instruments in the airplane, until the brain once again adjusts, and vestibular sensory input agrees with visual input.

== See also ==
- Patsy Cline airplane crash
- Spiral mode
- Continued VFR into IMC
