= Sensory illusions in aviation =

Misjudgment of true orientation by pilots

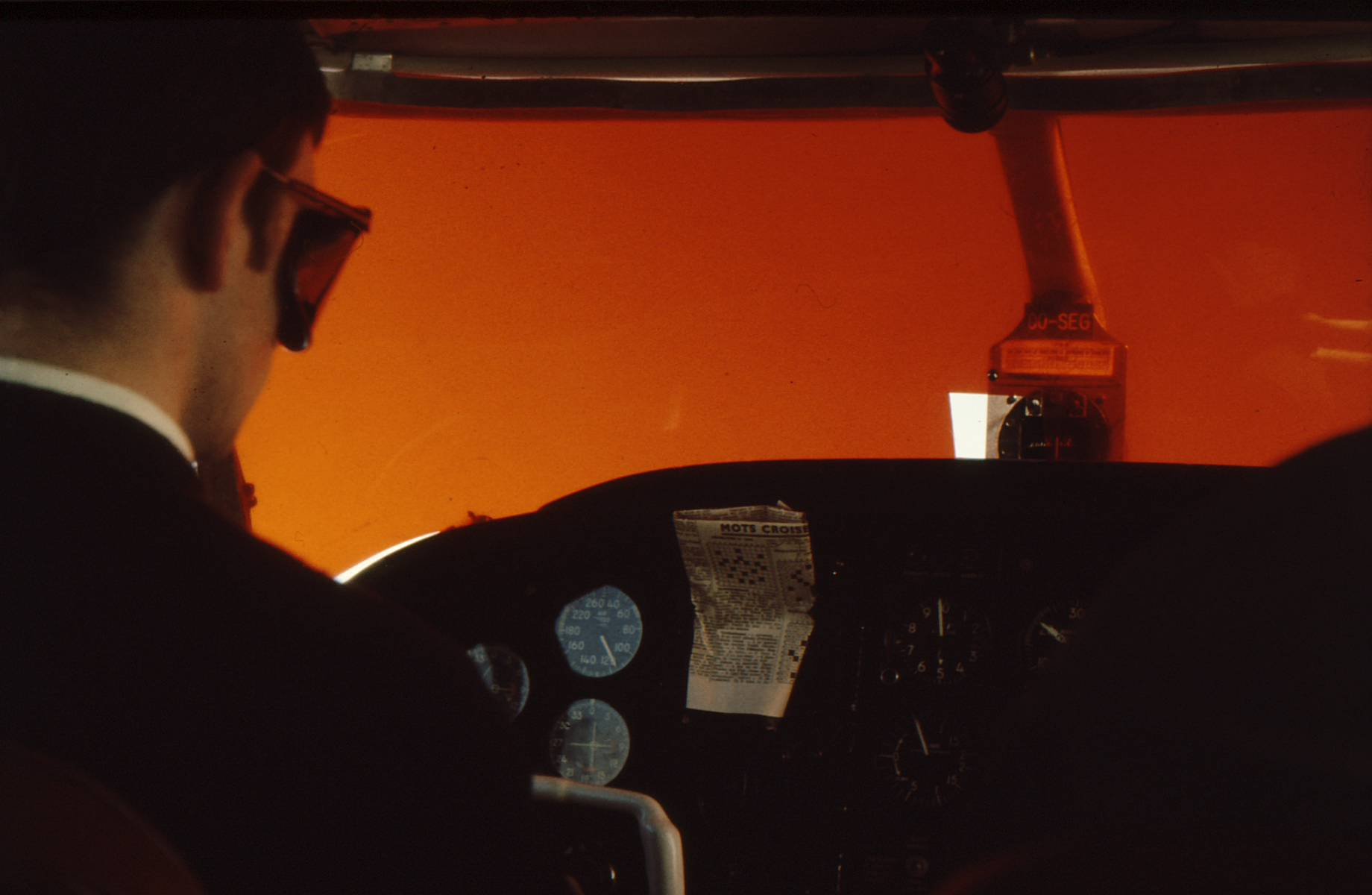
Blind flying. The pilot wears goggles blocking the colors transparent through the orange plastic sheet in front of him. The instructor wears no goggles and so has an outside view tinted orange.

Human senses are not naturally geared for the in-flight environment. Pilots may experience disorientation and loss of perspective, creating illusions that range from false horizons to sensory conflict with instrument readings or the misjudging of altitude over water.

== Vestibular system ==
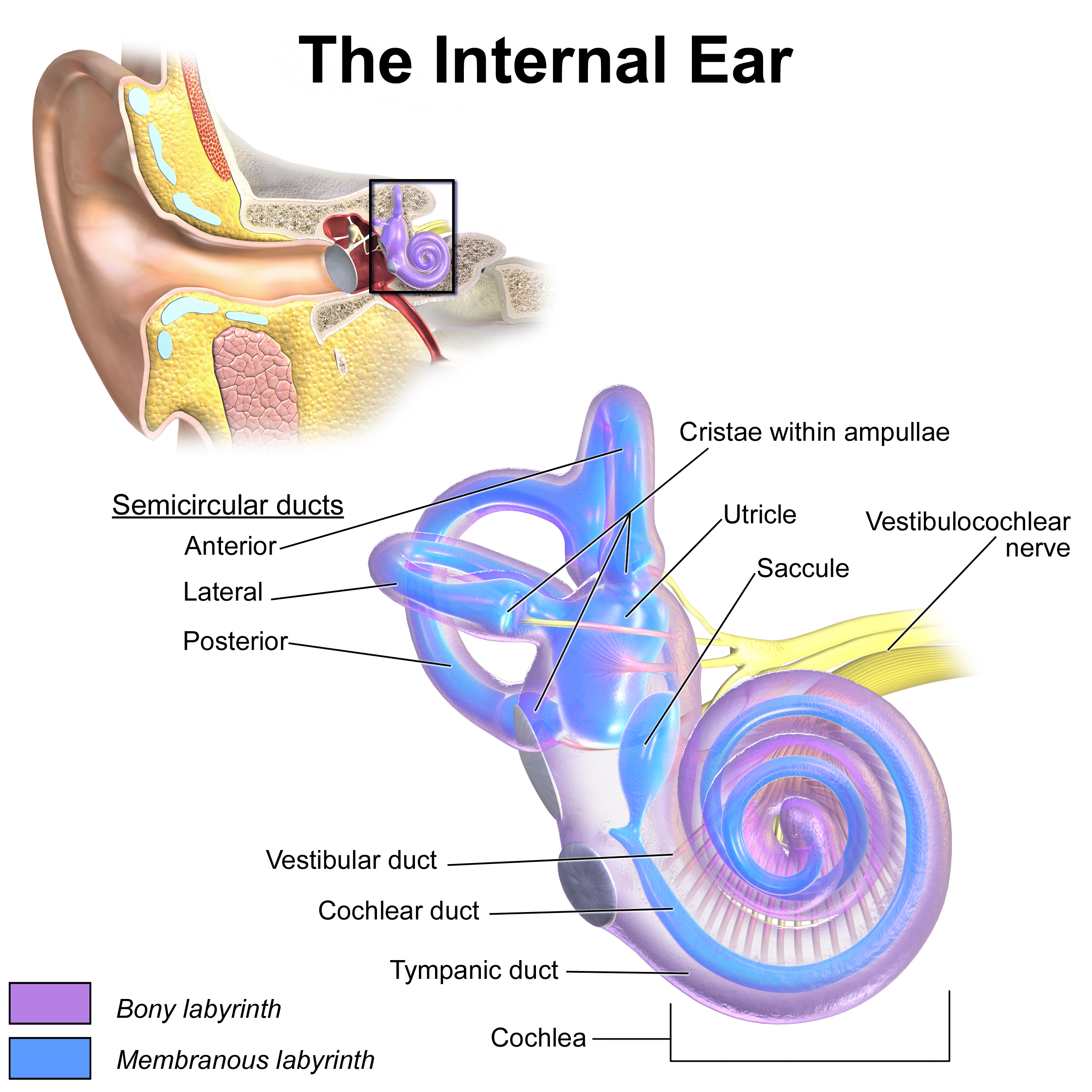
Diagram of inner ear and vestibular system

Animation demonstrating how the hairs in the semicircular canal detect angular motion, the input lag, and eventual acclimation to angular motion

The vestibular system, which is responsible for the sense of balance in humans, consists of the otolith organs and the semicircular canals. Illusions in aviation are caused when the brain cannot reconcile inputs from the vestibular system and visual system. The three semicircular canals, which recognize accelerations in pitch, yaw, and roll, are stimulated by angular accelerations; while the otolith organs, the saccule and utricle, are stimulated by linear accelerations. Stimulation of the semicircular canals occurs when the movement of the endolymph inside the canals causes movement of the crista ampullaris and the hair cells within them. Stimulation of the otolith organs occurs when gravitational forces or linear accelerations cause movement of the otolith membrane, the otoliths, or the hair cells of the macula.

Somatogyral illusions occur as a result of angular accelerations stimulating the semicircular canals. Somatogravic illusions, on the other hand, occur as a result of linear accelerations stimulating the otolith organs.

== Vestibular/somatogyral ==
Illusions involving the semicircular and somatogyral canals of the vestibular system of the ear occur primarily under conditions of unreliable or unavailable external visual references and result in false sensations of rotation. These include the leans, the graveyard spin and spiral, and the Coriolis illusion.

=== The leans ===
This is the most common illusion during flight, and can be caused by a sudden return to wings-level flight following a gradual entry and prolonged application of bank that had gone unnoticed by the pilot. The reason a pilot can be unaware of such an attitude change in the first place is that human exposure to a rotational acceleration of ~1 degrees per second² or less is below the detection threshold of the semicircular canals. Rolling wings-level from such an attitude may cause an illusion that the aircraft is banking in the opposite direction. In response to such an illusion, a pilot will tend to roll back in the direction of the original bank in a corrective attempt to regain the perception of a level attitude.

=== Graveyard spin ===
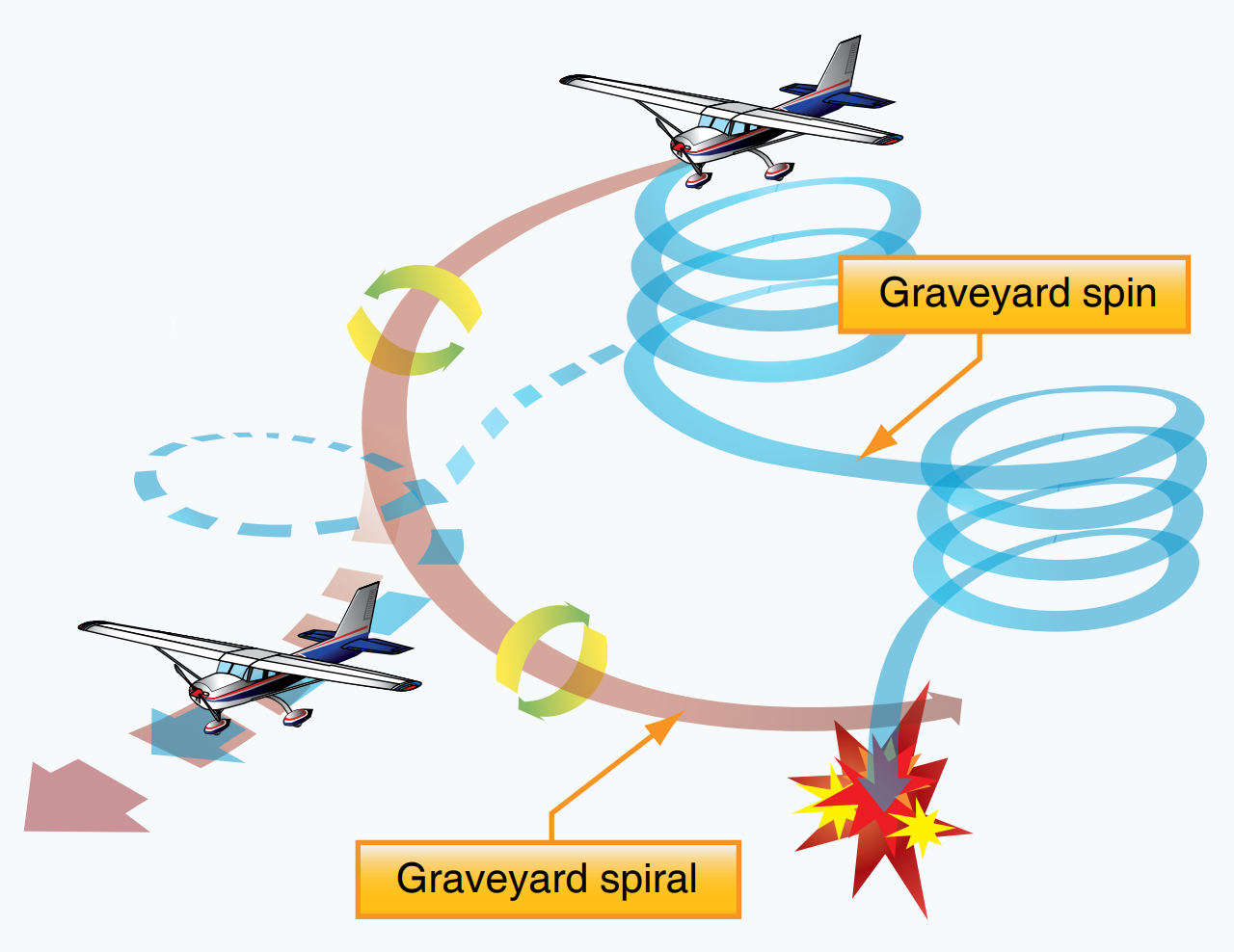
Graveyard spin (top right), graveyard spiral (left)

The graveyard spin is an illusion that can occur with a pilot who enters into a spin, and it is characterized by the pilot becoming less aware of the sense of rotation induced by the spin as the spin continues. As the pilot becomes less aware of the spin, any correction of the spin may cause the pilot to sense that he or she is spinning in the opposite direction. As an example, if the airplane is spinning to the left but goes unnoticed for a period of time sufficient for the pilot to become desensitized to the magnitude of the spin, a small adjustment to the right rudder may leave the pilot with a sensation of spinning to the right. As a result, the pilot will apply left rudder and unknowingly re-enter the original left spin. Cross-checking the airplane's flight instruments would show that the airplane is still in a turn, which causes sensory conflict for the pilot. If the pilot does not correct the spin, the airplane will continue to lose altitude until it crashes into the ground.

=== Graveyard spiral ===
The graveyard spiral is characterized by the pilot mistakenly believing they are in wings-level flight when the aircraft is in fact engaged in a banking turn, and the pilot notices the altimeter indicating an ongoing drop in altitude. The sensory disorientation of returning from a prolonged banking turn to wings-level flight can cause the pilot to re-enter the banking turn, as in the graveyard spin illusion. While the plane continues in the turn and begins to indicate a loss of altitude, the pilot will try to correct the loss of altitude by "pulling up" on the plane's controls. Attempting to adjust the controls in this way will have the effect of tightening the radius of the turn and eventually quickening the rate of descent until the pilot is visually cued to the nature of the error or contact with the terrain occurs. Two of the most famous cases of an aircraft mishap from this form of spatial disorientation are the 1963 crash that killed singer Patsy Cline near Camden, Tennessee and the 1999 crash that killed John F. Kennedy Jr. near Martha's Vineyard.

=== Coriolis illusion ===
This involves the simultaneous stimulation of two semicircular canals and is associated with a sudden tilting (forward or backwards) of the pilot's head while the aircraft is turning. This can occur when tilting the head down (to look at an approach chart or to write on the knee pad), up (to look at an overhead instrument or switch), or sideways. This can produce an overpowering sensation that the aircraft is rolling, pitching, and yawing all at the same time, which can be compared with the sensation of rolling down a hillside. This illusion can make the pilot quickly become disoriented and lose control of the aircraft.

== Vestibular/somatogravic ==
Somatogravic illusions are caused by linear accelerations. These illusions involving the utricle and the saccule of the vestibular system are most likely to occur under conditions with unreliable or unavailable external visual references.

=== Inversion ===
An abrupt change from climb to straight-and-level flight can stimulate the otolith organs enough to create the illusion of tumbling backwards, or inversion illusion. The disoriented pilot may push the aircraft abruptly into a nose-low attitude, possibly intensifying this illusion.

=== Head-up ===
The head-up illusion involves a sudden forward linear acceleration during level flight where the pilot perceives the illusion that the nose of the aircraft is pitching up. The pilot's response to this illusion would be to push the yoke or the stick forward to pitch the nose of the aircraft down. A night take-off from a well-lit airport into a totally dark sky (black hole) or a catapult take-off from an aircraft carrier can also lead to this illusion, and could result in a crash.

=== Head-down ===
The head-down illusion involves a sudden linear deceleration (air braking, lowering flaps, decreasing engine power) during level flight where the pilot perceives the illusion that the nose of the aircraft is pitching down. The pilot's response to this illusion would be to pitch the nose of the aircraft up. If this illusion occurs during a low-speed final approach, the pilot could stall the aircraft.

== Visual ==
Visual illusions are familiar to most people. Even under conditions of good visibility, one can experience visual illusions.

=== Linear perspective ===
This illusion may make a pilot change (increase or decrease) the slope of their final approach. They are caused by runways with different widths, upsloping or downsloping runways, and upsloping or downsloping final approach terrain. Pilots learn to recognize a normal final approach by developing and recalling a mental image of the expected relationship between the length and the width of an average runway. An example would be a pilot used to small general aviation fields visiting a large international airport. The much wider runway would give the pilot the mental picture of the point where they would usually begin the flare, when they are much higher than they should be. A pilot flying an aircraft where the cockpit height relative to the ground is vastly higher or lower than they are used to can cause a similar illusion in the last part of the approach.

==== Upsloping terrain or narrow or long runway ====
A final approach over an upsloping terrain with a flat runway, or to an unusually narrow or long runway may produce the visual illusion of being too high on final approach. The pilot may then increase their rate of descent, positioning the aircraft unusually low on the approach path.

==== Downsloping terrain or wide runway ====
A final approach over a downsloping terrain with a flat runway, or to an unusually wide runway, may produce the visual illusion of being too low on final approach. The pilot may then pitch the aircraft's nose up to increase the altitude, which can result in a low-altitude stall or a missed approach.

=== Other ===
==== Black-hole approach ====
A black-hole approach illusion can happen during a final approach at night (with no stars or moonlight) over water or unlit terrain to a lighted runway, in which the horizon is not visible. As the name suggests, it involves an approach to landing during the night where there is nothing to see between the aircraft and the intended runway, there is just a visual "black hole". Pilots too often confidently proceed with a visual approach instead of relying on instruments during nighttime landings. As a result, this can lead to the pilot experiencing glide path overestimation (GPO) because of the lack of peripheral visual cues, especially, below the aircraft. In addition, with no peripheral visual cues allowing for an orientation relative to the earth there can be an illusion of the pilot being upright and the runway being tilted and sloping. As a result, the pilot initiates an aggressive descent and wrongly adjusts to an unsafe glide path below the desired three-degree glide path.

==== Autokinesis ====
The autokinetic illusion occurs at night or in conditions with poor visual cues and gives the pilot the impression that a stationary light source is on a collision course with the aircraft. This illusion is caused by very small movements of the eyes in conjunction with staring at a fixed single point of light (ground light or a star) in a totally dark or featureless background. In such conditions, these otherwise harmless eye movements are interpreted by the brain as movement of the object being viewed (due to the lack of points of reference).

Planets or stars in the night sky often cause the illusion, having been mistaken for landing lights of oncoming aircraft, satellites, or even UFOs. An example of a star that commonly causes this illusion is Sirius, which is the brightest star in the night sky and in winter appears over the entire continental United States at one to three fist-widths above the horizon. At dusk, the planet Venus can cause this illusion to occur and many pilots have mistaken it as lights coming from other aircraft.

==== False visual reference ====
False visual reference illusions may cause the pilot to orient the aircraft in relation to a false horizon; these illusions can be caused by flying over a banked cloud, night flying over featureless terrain with ground lights that are indistinguishable from a dark sky with stars, or night flying over a featureless terrain with a clearly defined pattern of ground lights and a dark, starless sky.

==== Glassy water landings in seaplanes ====
Calm glassy water poses a hazard to pilots of seaplanes because the absence of waves hinders accurate judgment of the aircraft's altitude above the water surface on landing. If the pilot overestimates the aircraft's altitude and fails to flare, the tips of the floats may be driven into the water, flipping the seaplane; similarly, if the pilot underestimates the aircraft's altitude, flares too high and stalls, the aircraft will pitch down with the same potential result. Glassy water may also result in an unusually clear view of the lake or sea floor and abnormally brilliant reflections of clouds or shore features; these extraneous visual cues may further disorient the pilot. These hazards may be mitigated by flying the final approach over land or parallel to a nearby shoreline, allowing the pilot to use the land as a visual reference; however, the pilot must take care that the presumably shallow landing zone is free of obstructions. In the absence of a suitable landing area near shore, the recommended procedure is to make a long and shallow approach at a slow and steady descent rate and not to attempt to flare; however, the pilot should account for the increased glide and landing distance when using this technique.

==== Vection ====
This is when the brain perceives peripheral motion, without sufficient other cues, as applying to itself. Consider the example of being in a car in lanes of traffic, when cars in the adjacent lane start creeping slowly forward. This can produce the perception of actually moving backwards, particularly if the wheels of the other cars are not visible. A similar illusion can happen while taxiing an aircraft.

==== Repeating pattern ====
This is when an aircraft is moving at very low altitude over a surface that has a regular repeating pattern, for example ripples on water. The pilot's eyes can misinterpret the altitude if each eye lines up different parts of the pattern rather than both eyes lining up on the same part. This leads to a large error in altitude perception, and any descent can result in impact with the surface. This illusion is of particular danger to helicopter pilots operating at a few metres' altitude over calm water.

== Examples ==
- 1965 Carmel mid-air collision, false visual reference illusion (upsloping cloud tops)
- 1999 Martha's Vineyard plane crash, spatial disorientation (controversial)
- Adam Air Flight 574, graveyard spiral (pilots preoccupied with unrelated equipment failure)
- Aeroperú Flight 603, spatial disorientation (instrument failure at night over sea, likely not helped by contradictory, simultaneous stall and overspeed warnings)
- Alitalia Flight 4128, black-hole approach illusion
- AIRES Flight 8250, black-hole approach illusion
- Air India Flight 855, the leans
- Afriqiyah Airways Flight 771, head-up illusion
- Atlas Air Flight 3591, head-up illusion
- Copa Airlines Flight 201, the leans
- The Day the Music Died, spatial disorientation (controversial)
- Flash Airlines Flight 604, the leans (controversial)
- Gulf Air Flight 072, head-up illusion
- Mount Erebus disaster, false visual reference illusion (featureless terrain indistinguishable from sky)
- Richard Rockefeller#Death, spatial disorientation
- Swissair Flight 111, the leans (secondary to electrical fire and multiple equipment failures)
- Tatarstan Airlines Flight 363, head-up illusion
- VASP Flight 168, black-hole approach illusion
- West Air Sweden Flight 294, head-up illusion (secondary to instrument failure)
- Fly Dubai Flight 981, Pitch-Up illusion on pilot (due to hybrid go-around procedure which caused excessive acceleration)

== See also ==
- Index of aviation articles
- Pilot error
- Brownout
- Spatial disorientation
- Bárány chair
- Kopp–Etchells effect
- Controlled flight into terrain
- Mandelbaum effect
