= Sense of balance =

Physiological sense regarding posture

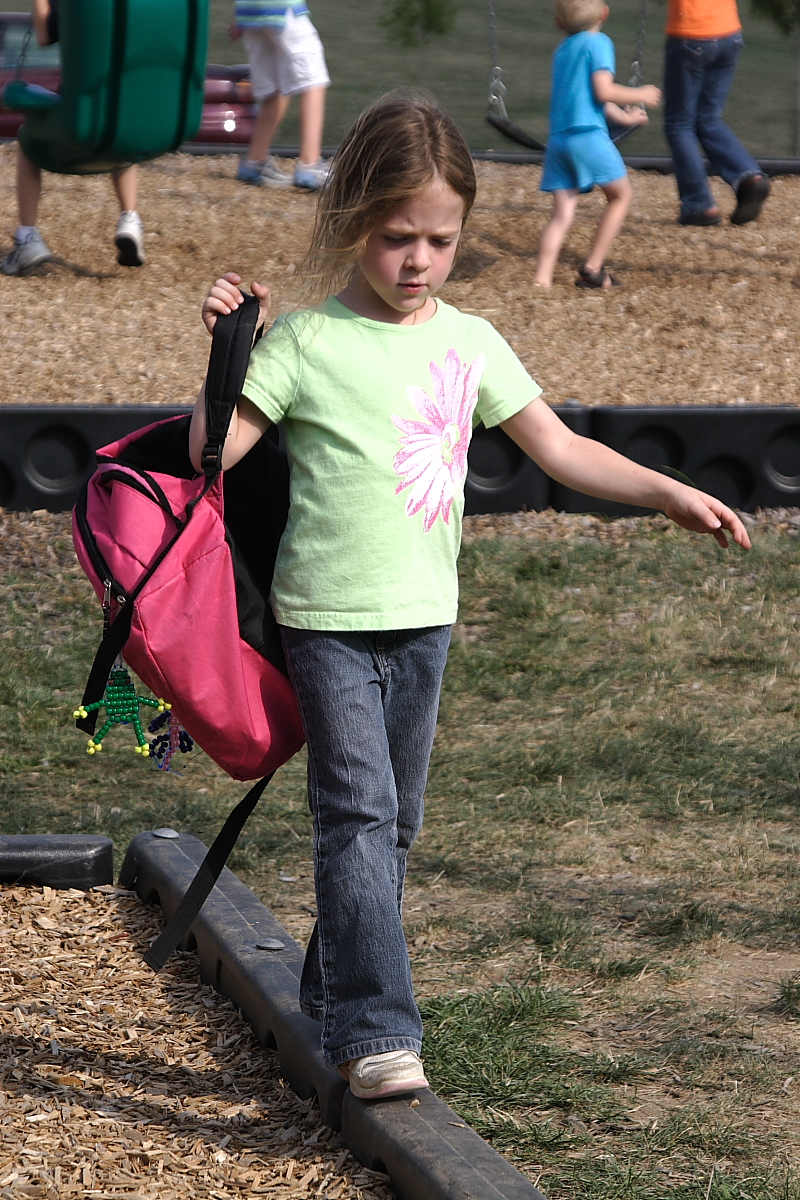
Balance skill development in children

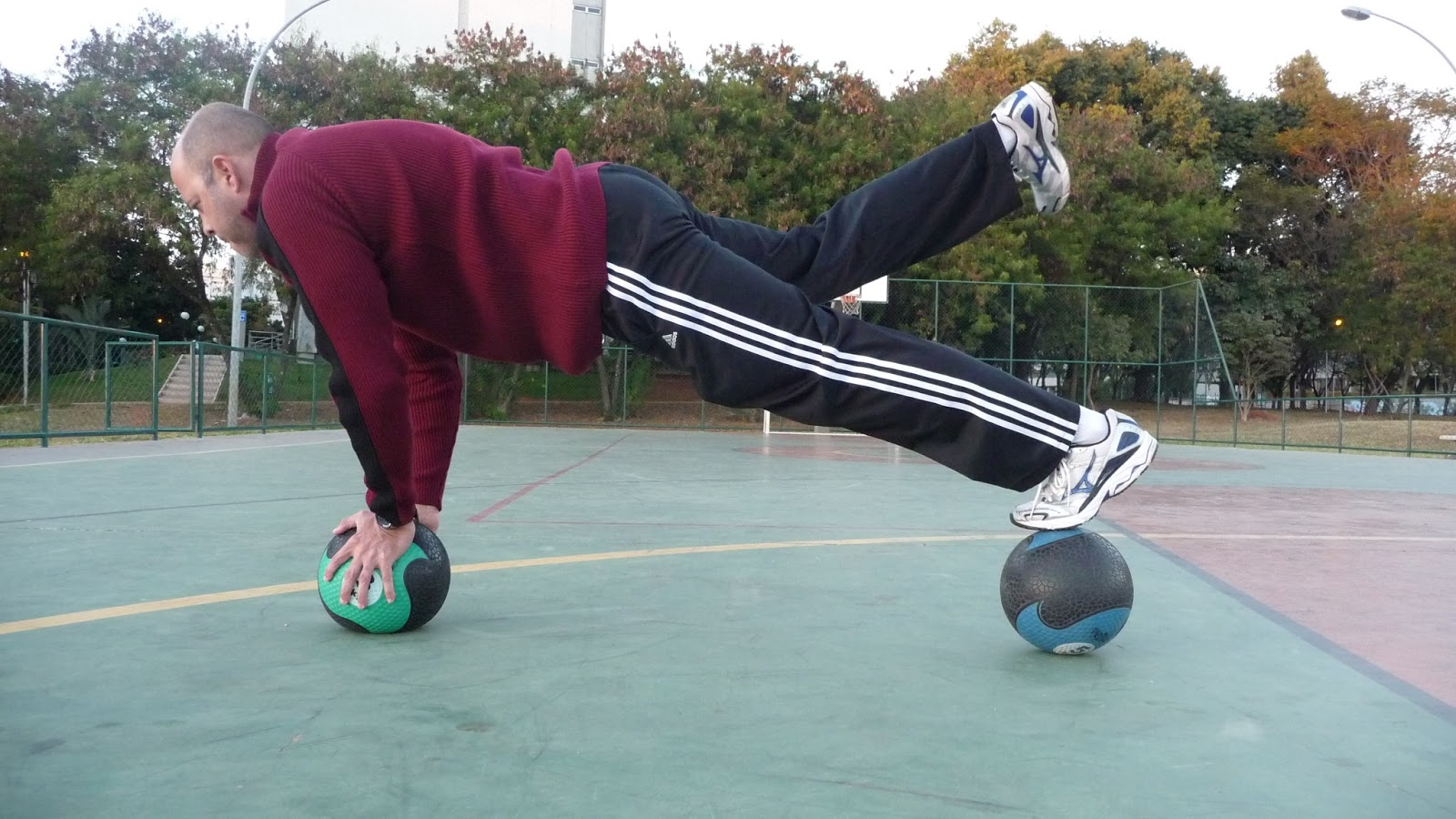
Balance training using medicine balls

The sense of balance or equilibrioception is the perception of balance and spatial orientation. It helps prevent humans and nonhuman animals from falling over when standing or moving. Equilibrioception is the result of a number of sensory systems working together; the eyes (visual system), the inner ears (vestibular system), and the body's sense of where it is in space (proprioception) ideally need to be intact.

The vestibular system, the region of the inner ear where three semicircular canals converge, works with the visual system to keep objects in focus when the head is moving. This is called the vestibulo-ocular reflex (VOR). The balance system works with the visual and skeletal systems (the muscles and joints and their sensors) to maintain orientation or balance. Visual signals sent to the brain about the body's position in relation to its surroundings are processed by the brain and compared to information from the vestibular and skeletal systems.

== Vestibular system ==
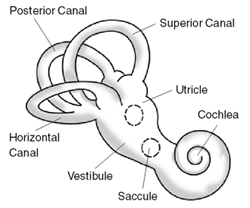
Diagram of vestibular system

In the vestibular system, equilibrioception is determined by the level of a fluid called endolymph in the labyrinth, a complex set of tubing in the inner ear.

== Dysfunction ==
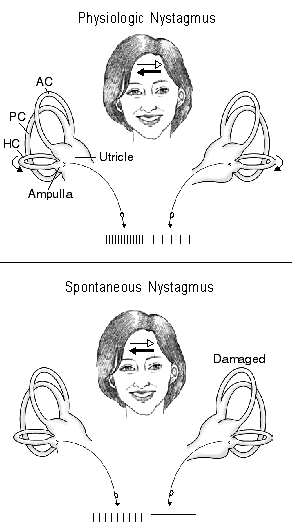
This figure shows nerve activity associated with rotational-induced physiologic nystagmus and spontaneous nystagmus resulting from a lesion of one labyrinth. Thin straight arrows show direction of slow components, thick straight arrows show direction of fast components, and curved arrows show direction of endolymph flow in the horizontal semicircular canals. The three semicircular canals are marked AC (anterior canal), PC (posterior canal), and HC (horizontal canal).

When the sense of balance is interrupted it causes dizziness, disorientation and nausea. Balance can be upset by Ménière's disease, superior canal dehiscence syndrome, an inner ear infection, by a bad common cold affecting the head or a number of other medical conditions including but not limited to vertigo. It can also be temporarily disturbed by quick or prolonged acceleration, for example, riding on a merry-go-round. Blows can also affect equilibrioreception, especially those to the side of the head or directly to the ear.

Most astronauts find that their sense of balance is impaired when in orbit because they are in a constant state of weightlessness. This causes a form of motion sickness called space adaptation syndrome.

== System overview ==
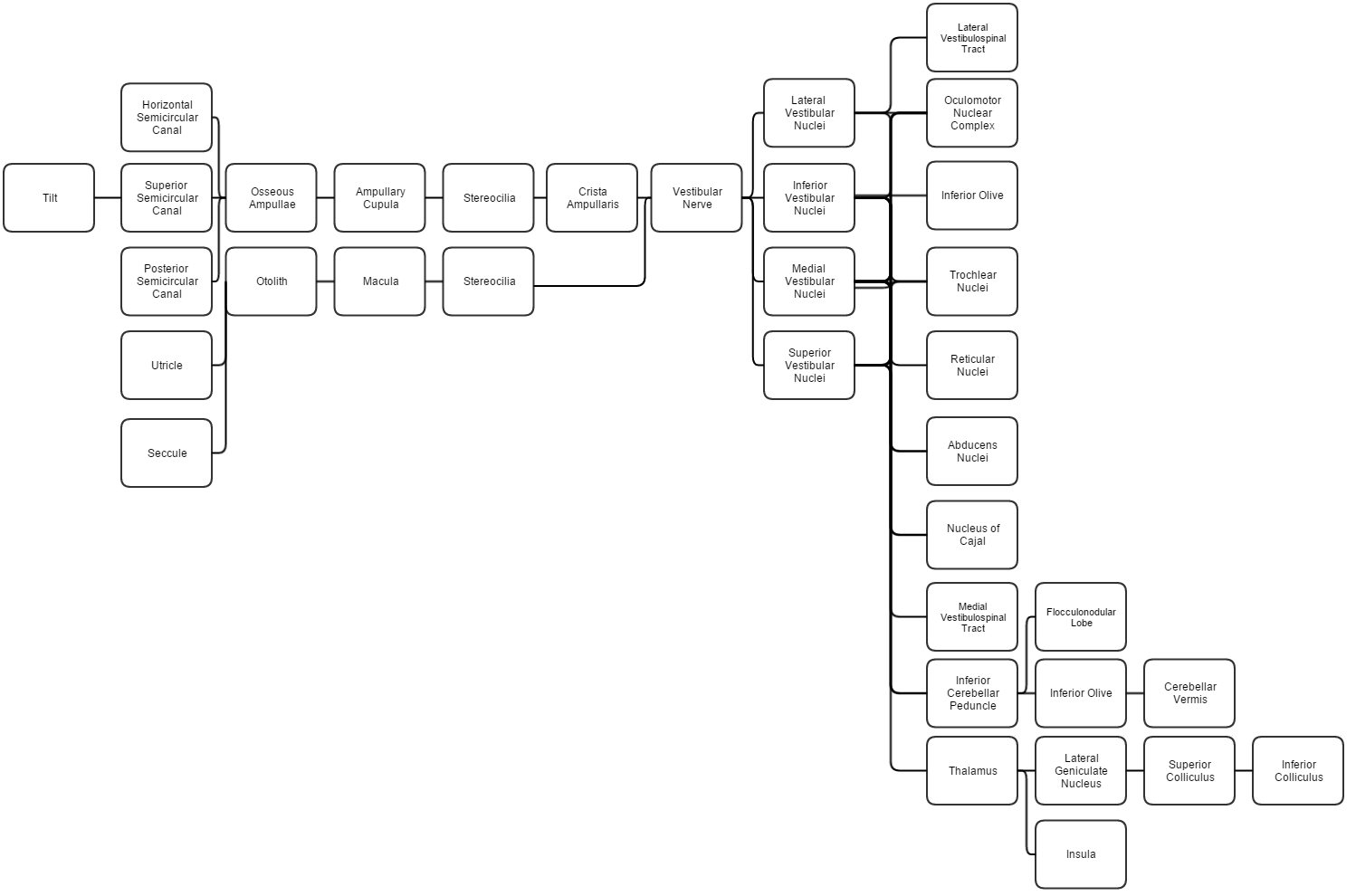
This diagram linearly (unless otherwise mentioned) tracks the projections of all known structures that allow for balance and acceleration to their relevant endpoints in the human brain.

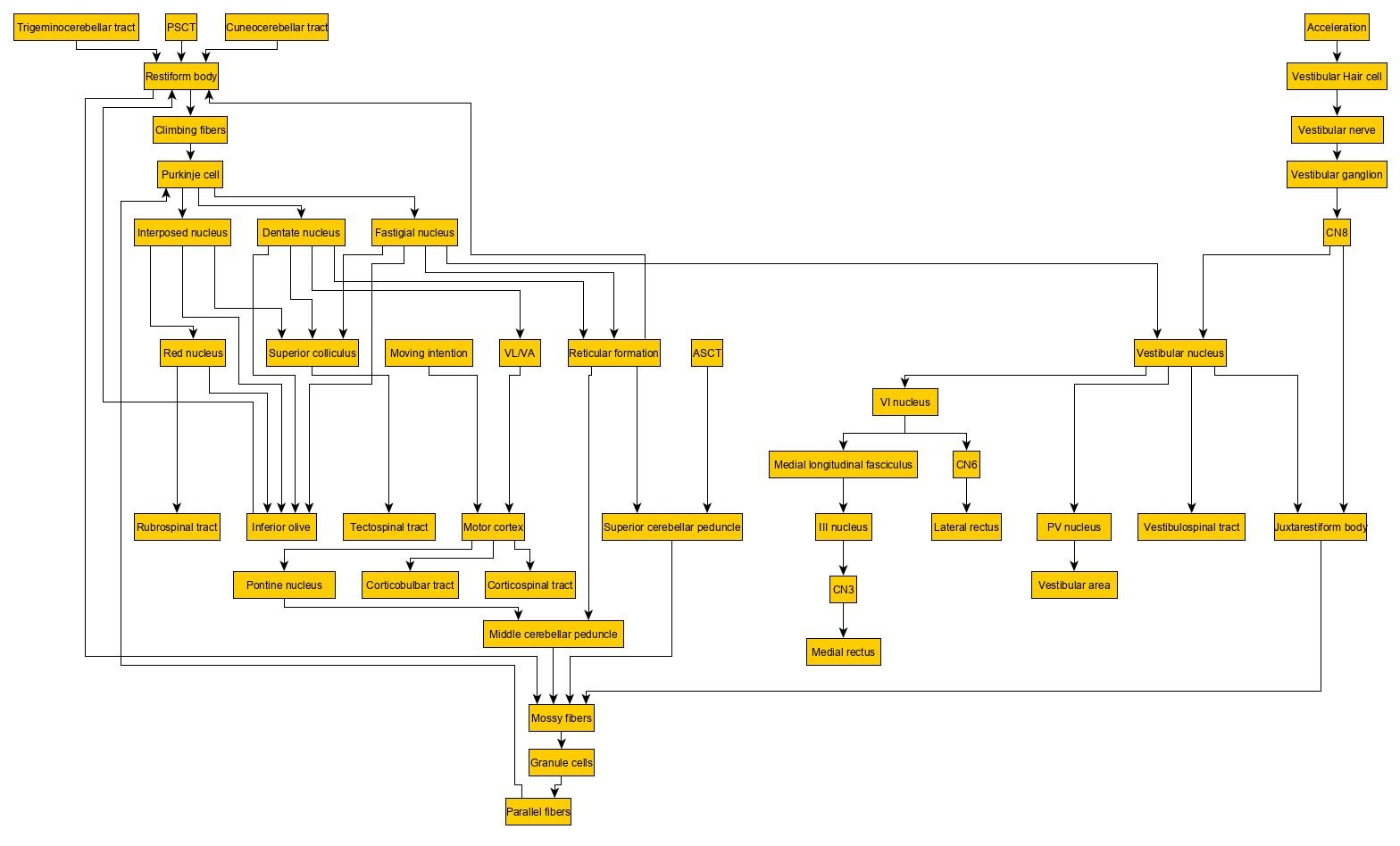
Another diagram showing neural pathway of vestibular/balance system. Arrows show the direction of information relay.

This overview also explains acceleration as its processes are interconnected with balance.

=== Mechanical ===
There are five sensory organs innervated by the vestibular nerve; three semicircular canals (Horizontal SCC, Superior SCC, Posterior SCC) and two otolith organs (saccule and utricle). Each semicircular canal (SSC) is a thin tube that doubles in thickness briefly at a point called osseous ampullae. At their center-base, each contains an ampullary cupula. The cupula is a gelatin bulb connected to the stereocilia of hair cells, affected by the relative movement of the endolymph it is bathed in.

Since the cupula is part of the bony labyrinth, it rotates along with actual head movement, and by itself without the endolymph, it cannot be stimulated and therefore, could not detect movement. Endolymph follows the rotation of the canal; however, due to inertia its movement initially lags behind that of the bony labyrinth. The delayed movement of the endolymph bends and activates the cupula. When the cupula bends, the connected stereocilia bend along with it, activating chemical reactions in the hair cells surrounding crista ampullaris and eventually create action potentials carried by the vestibular nerve signaling to the body that it has moved in space.

After any extended rotation, the endolymph catches up to the canal and the cupula returns to its upright position and resets. When extended rotation ceases, however, endolymph continues, (due to inertia) which bends and activates the cupula once again to signal a change in movement.

Pilots doing long banked turns begin to feel upright (no longer turning) as endolymph matches canal rotation; once the pilot exits the turn the cupula is once again stimulated, causing the feeling of turning the other way, rather than flying straight and level.

The horizontal SCC handles head rotations about a vertical axis (e.g. looking side to side), the superior SCC handles head movement about a lateral axis (e.g. head to shoulder), and the posterior SCC handles head rotation about a rostral-caudal axis (e.g. nodding). SCC sends adaptive signals, unlike the two otolith organs, the saccule and utricle, whose signals do not adapt over time.

A shift in the otolithic membrane that stimulates the cilia is considered the state of the body until the cilia are once again stimulated. For example, lying down stimulates cilia and standing up stimulates cilia, however, for the time spent lying the signal that you are lying remains active, even though the membrane resets.

Otolithic organs have a thick, heavy gelatin membrane that, due to inertia (like endolymph), lags behind and continues ahead past the macula it overlays, bending and activating the contained cilia.

Utricle responds to linear accelerations and head-tilts in the horizontal plane (head to shoulder), whereas saccule responds to linear accelerations and head-tilts in the vertical plane (up and down). Otolithic organs update the brain on the head-location when not moving; SCC update during movement.

Kinocilium are the longest stereocilia and are positioned (one per 40-70 regular cilia) at the end of the bundle. If stereocilia go towards kinocilium, depolarization occurs, causing more neurotransmitters, and more vestibular nerve firings, as compared to when stereocilia tilt away from kinocilium (hyperpolarization, less neurotransmitter, less firing).

=== Neural ===
First order vestibular nuclei (VN) project to lateral vestibular nucleus (IVN), medial vestibular nucleus (MVN), and superior vestibular nucleus (SVN).

The inferior cerebellar peduncle is the largest center through which balance information passes. It is the area of integration between proprioceptive, and vestibular inputs, to aid in unconscious maintenance of balance and posture.

The inferior olivary nucleus aids in complex motor tasks by encoding coordinating timing sensory information; this is decoded and acted upon in the cerebellum.

The cerebellar vermis has three main parts. The vestibulocerebellum regulates eye movements by the integration of visual info provided by the superior colliculus and balance information. The spinocerebellum integrates visual, auditory, proprioceptive, and balance information to act out body and limb movements. It receives input from the trigeminal nerve, dorsal column (of the spinal cord), midbrain, thalamus, reticular formation and vestibular nuclei (medulla) outputs. Lastly, the cerebrocerebellum plans, times, and initiates movement after evaluating sensory input from, primarily, motor cortex areas, via pons and cerebellar dentate nucleus. It outputs to the thalamus, motor cortex areas, and red nucleus.

The flocculonodular lobe is a cerebellar lobe that helps maintain body equilibrium by modifying muscle tone (the continuous and passive muscle contractions).

MVN and IVN are in the medulla, LVN and SVN are smaller and in pons. SVN, MVN, and IVN ascend within the medial longitudinal fasciculus. LVN descend the spinal cord within the lateral vestibulospinal tract and ends at the sacrum. MVN also descend the spinal cord, within the medial vestibulospinal tract, ending at lumbar 1.

The thalamic reticular nucleus distributes information to various other thalamic nuclei, regulating the flow of information. It is speculatively able to stop signals, ending transmission of unimportant info. The thalamus relays info between pons (cerebellum link), motor cortices, and insula.

The insula is also heavily connected to motor cortices; the insula is likely where balance is likely brought into perception.

The oculomotor nuclear complex refers to fibers going to tegmentum (eye movement), red nucleus (gait (natural limb movement)), substantia nigra (reward), and cerebral peduncle (motor relay). Nucleus of Cajal are one of the named oculomotor nuclei, they are involved in eye movements and reflex gaze coordination.

The abducens nerve solely innervates the lateral rectus muscle of the eye, moving the eye with the trochlear nerve. The trochlear solely innervates the superior oblique muscle of the eye. Together, trochlear and abducens contract and relax to simultaneously direct the pupil towards an angle and depress the globe on the opposite side of the eye (e.g. looking down directs the pupil down and depresses (towards the brain) the top of the globe). The pupil is not only directed, but often rotated, by these muscles. (See visual system)

The thalamus and superior colliculus are connected via the lateral geniculate nucleus. The superior colliculus (SC) is the topographical map for balance and quick orienting movements with primarily visual inputs. SC integrates multiple senses.

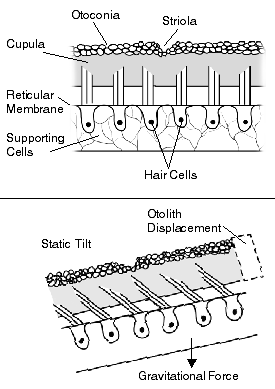
Illustration of the flow of fluid in the ear, which in turn causes displacement of the top portion of the hair cells that are embedded in the jelly-like cupula. Also shows the utricle and saccule organs that are responsible for detecting linear acceleration, or movement in a straight line.

== Other animals ==
Some animals have better equilibrioception than humans; for example, a cat uses its inner ear and tail to walk on a thin fence.

Equilibrioception in many marine animals is done with an entirely different organ, the statocyst, which detects the position of tiny calcareous stones to determine which way is "up".

== In plants ==
Plants could be said to exhibit a form of equilibrioception, in that when rotated from their normal attitude the stems grow in the direction that is upward (away from gravity) while their roots grow downward (in the direction of gravity). This phenomenon is known as gravitropism and it has been shown that, for example, poplar stems can detect reorientation and inclination.

== See also ==
- Proprioception
- Vertigo
