= Coriolis effect (perception) =

Physiological condition affecting semicircular canal resulting in dizziness and nausea

In psychophysical perception, the Coriolis effect (also referred to as the Coriolis illusion or the vestibular Coriolis effect) is the misperception of body orientation due to head movement while under the effect of rotation, often inducing nausea. This effect comes about as the head is moved in contrary or similar motion with the body during the time of a spin. This goes on to affect the vestibular system, particularly the semicircular canals which are affected by the acceleration. This causes a sense of dizziness or nausea before equilibrium is restored after the head returns to a stabilized state. Crucially, this illusion is based entirely upon perception, and is largely due to conflicting signals between one's sight and one's perception of their body position or motion. Examples of situations where this can arise are circular acceleration and movement during a circular rotation.

There is also the pseudo-Coriolis effect (also referred to as the optokinetic pseudo-Coriolis effect), which takes place when there is no physical circular movement, only visual. Perceptually it feels the same as the Coriolis effect, being perceived as self motion inducing the same kind of nausea and often the cause of motion sickness.

== Causes and effects ==
The physiological mechanism by which the effect occurs is all contained within the semicircular canals, as determined by head tilt. When rotating and tilting a person's head, the endolymphatic fluid within the canal may be subjected to the Coriolis force. This occurs when the motion is at a constant rate such that the fluid and the canals move at the same rate, causing the sensation of rotation to disappear. When interrupted by a head movement, the fluid will move at an angle, affecting the cupula, which will cause a perceived rotation that is not occurring.

This most often occurs when a person's head is moved out of alignment during a spin. If individuals are spinning to the left along their y-axis and then push their head forward, that will bring their heads out of alignment and make it subject to Coriolis force and resultant effect. The manifestation of this effect is that the individuals will feel like their heads are tilting to their left.

This can cause nausea, disorientation, and vomiting resulting from motion sickness. These feelings of discomfort arise in the body due to a variety of signals when the signals being sent by the vestibular system and visual system are not in agreement, i.e. the eyes may be telling the body that one is not moving, but the vestibular systems' fine-tuned senses are detecting and communicating the opposite.

== Examples ==
The Coriolis effect is a concern for pilots and astronauts, where it can cause extreme disorientation. This happens as pilots turn or rotate their aircraft, while also turning their head. It has been noted as difficult to report, as oftentimes the sensation is difficult to describe. In extreme situations, this can cause the pilot to lose control of the aircraft. Due to the possible dangers of this, pilots are often trained physiologically, such as in a Bárány chair, to prepare for such circumstances, along with being trained to trust their flying instruments rather than their own visual perceptions.

The pseudo-Coriolis effect often occurs in VR simulations, where it can be perceived that motion is occurring without the body itself moving.

=== The Bárány chair demonstration ===
The Bárány chair is often used in the following way:

1. The subject sits in the chair with head down and eyes closed.
2. The chair is spun up to a below-threshold speed ($< 2\; \mathrm{deg/s}$). The subject does not feel rotation.
3. The chair is spun up to above-threshold speed. The subject feels rotation for a while.
4. Eventually in about 30 seconds, the feeling of rotation stops due to adaptation.
5. The chair is abruptly stopped, and the subject raises head up and opens eyes. The vestibular system signals as if the head is rotating side-to-side (in the coronal plane), but the vision system signals as if the head is not moving.

The explanation is as follows:

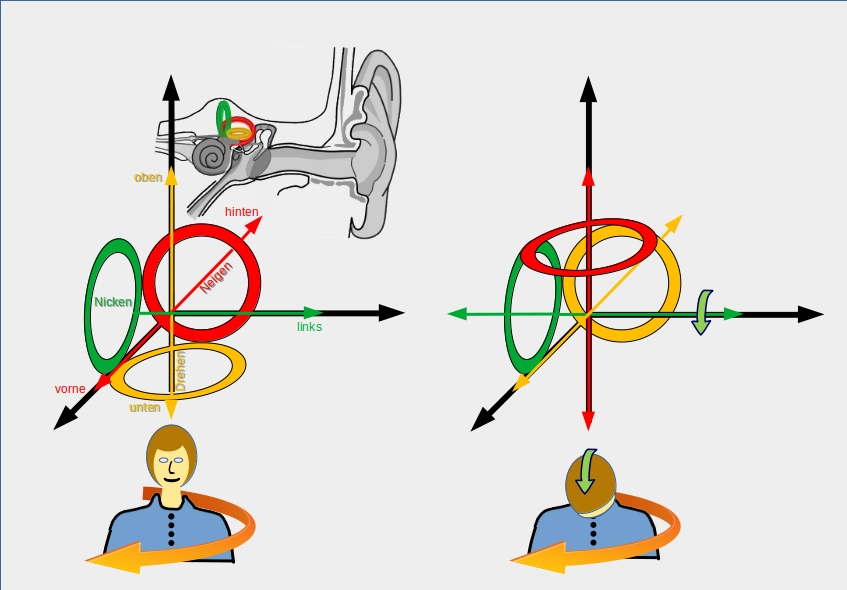
The Bárány chair demonstration.

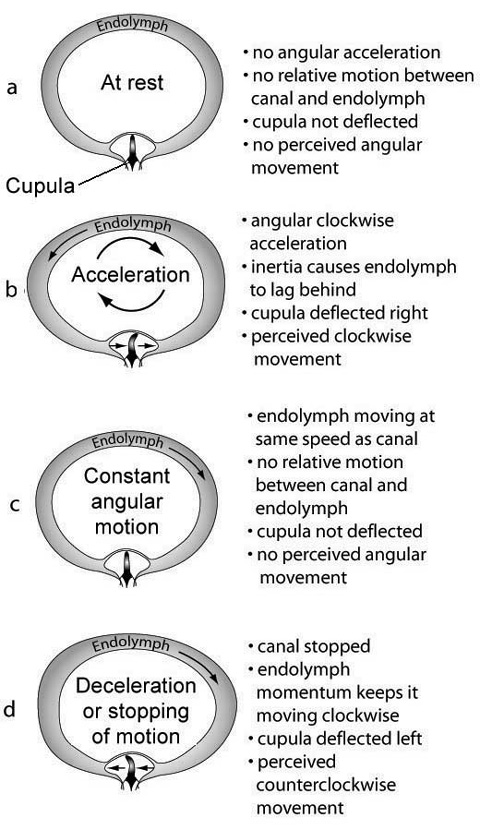

- Each of the three semicircular canals is effectively a damped oscillator with low inertia. When one rotates in space, the fluid in the canal rotates in the other direction, and this translates to neural signals indicating the current angular velocity.
- However, if the angular velocity remains stable, the fluids would eventually become equal with the walls again, and the sensed angular velocity returns to zero (adaptation).
- After abruptly stopping and raising the head, the fluid in the semicircular canal in the coronal plane flows in the opposite direction due to Coriolis effect, creating an illusory rotation, similar to the Compton generator.

== History ==
The term was first applied to perception by G. Schubert in 1954, where it was termed the vestibular Coriolis effect, since he hypothesized that it was caused by Coriolis force within the semicircular canals.

The Coriolis force was discovered by Gaspard-Gustave de Coriolis in 1832. By the end of the 19th century, Coriolis force had become a common phrase in meteorological literature. Coriolis force is classified as a fictitious force in rotating reference frames.

== See also ==
- Dizziness
- Equilibrioception
- Sensory illusions in aviation
- Doppler effect
