= Vestibular ganglion =

Ganglion of the vestibular nerve

Details

Identifiers
- Latin: ganglion vestibulare, ganglion Scarpae
- NeuroNames: 495
- TA98: A14.2.01.123
- TA2: 6309
- FMA: 53435

The vestibular ganglion (also Scarpa's ganglion) is a collection of cell bodies belonging to first order sensory neurons of the vestibular nerve. It is located within the internal auditory canal.

== Anatomy ==
=== Surrounding structure ===
The superior and inferior divisions of the vestibular nerve meet at the ganglion. Thereon, the fibers of second-order neurons of the vestibular nerve merge with those of the cochlear nerve (whose first-order neurons have already synapsed at the spiral ganglion) to proceed towards the CNS as a single unified vestibulocochlear nerve (cranial nerve VIII).

=== Internal structure ===
The ganglion contains the cell bodies of bipolar neurons whose peripheral processes form synaptic contact with hair cells of the vestibular sensory end organs. These include hair cells of the cristae ampullaris of the semicircular duct, and the maculae of the utricle and saccule.

=== Development ===
As with the entirety of the inner ear organs and associated sensory organs, the vestibular ganglion is established from a sole embryonic source, the otic placode and is formed during neurogenesis. The formation of the surrounding structures of the vestibular ganglion is a critical part of neurogenesis as the auditory and vestibular neurons segregate into the medial spiral ganglion and a lateral vestibular ganglion. Much is still not known about how auditory and vestibular neurons differentiate from each other both in terms of time and dimension, however, some studies suggest that they start to diverge very early, before or soon after they turn on a gene called Neurog1.

By the time gestation ends and birth occurs, the ganglion is already close to its final size.

== Etymology ==
It is named for Italian anatomist and surgeon, Antonio Scarpa due to his work in outlining and detailing the anatomy of the structure alongside surrounding structures of inner ear in his 1789 note "De structura fenestrae rotundae auris, et de tympano secundario".
