= The leans =

Spatial disorientation in aviation

The leans is the most common type of spatial disorientation for aviators. Through stabilization of the fluid in the semicircular canals, a pilot may perceive straight and level flight while actually in a banked turn. This is caused by a quick return to level flight after a gradual, prolonged turn that the pilot failed to notice. The phenomenon consists of a false perception of angular displacement about the roll axis and therefore becomes an illusion of bank. This illusion is often associated with a vestibulospinal reflex that results in the pilot actually leaning in the direction of the falsely perceived vertical. Other common explanations of the leans are due to deficiencies of both otolith-organ and semicircular-duct sensory mechanisms.

== Physiology ==
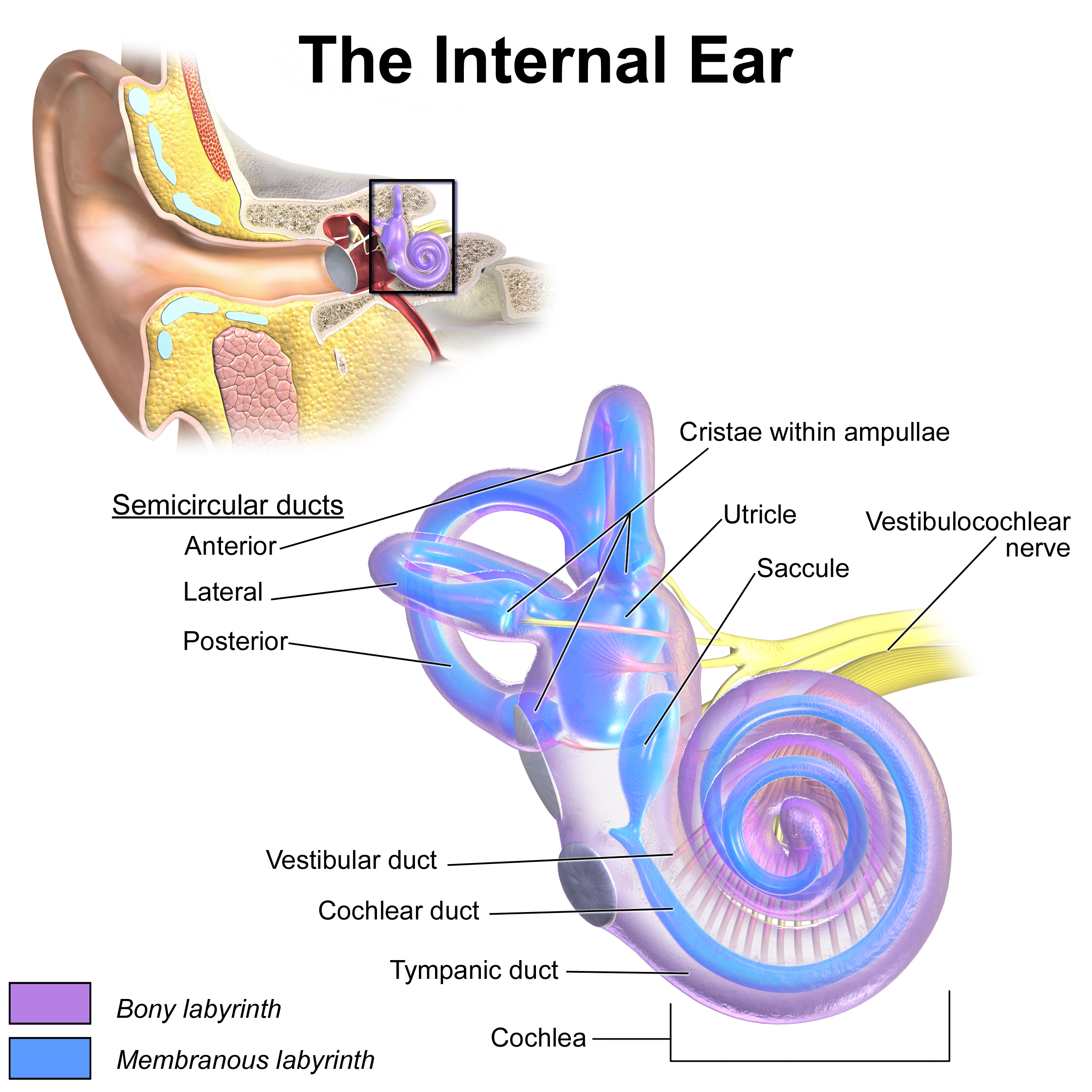
Diagram of inner ear and vestibular system

Animation demonstrating how the hairs in the semicircular canal detect angular motion, the input lag, and eventual acclimation to angular motion

The leans is a type of vestibular illusion in flight which causes spatial disorientation. The process involves the semicircular canals of the vestibular system. The semicircular canals detect angular acceleration. In total, there are three semicircular canals: the anterior, posterior, and lateral canals. Each canal is filled with a fluid called endolymph and each canal arises from a small bag-like structure called a utricle. At the ends of each duct, there is a saclike portion called the ampulla. Inside are hair cells and supporting cells known as the crista ampullaris.

Changing a person's orientation will cause specific ducts to be stimulated due to these hair cells. When the head turns, the canals move but because of its inertia, the endolymph fluid tends to lag and thereby stimulates the hair cells. This stimulation results in awareness of angular acceleration in that plane. After approximately 10–20 seconds, the endolymph velocity matches that of the canal, which stops stimulation of the hair cells, and the person's awareness of rotation is reduced or stopped. In addition, the canals cannot detect rotational acceleration of approximately 2 degrees per second or lower; this is the detection threshold of the semicircular canals.

Therefore, a pilot may not notice a slow turn or a bank if entered gradually and maintained long enough. If the pilot then exits the turn or bank and levels the wings, the endolymph fluid continues to move, re-stimulating the hair cells and producing the illusion that the plane is banking too much in the opposite direction, due to the input lag. As a response, the pilot often leans in the direction of the original turn to attempt to correct and regain their perception of the correct vertical position. The leans may also be caused by peripheral visual orientation cues that become misled.

== Danger and risk ==
If a pilot does not notice the disorientation and continues to lean, the plane may over bank in the wrong direction and cause rolling. This is the most common spatial disorientation for pilots. In all cases of spatial orientation, pilots must be able to rely on their flight instruments when making control inputs to override false sensations. The Federal Aviation Administration warns pilots qualified solely under visual flight rules to avoid situations "when there is a possibility of getting trapped in deteriorating weather."

== See also ==
- Sensory illusions in aviation
