= Ampullary cupula =

Structure in the vestibular system

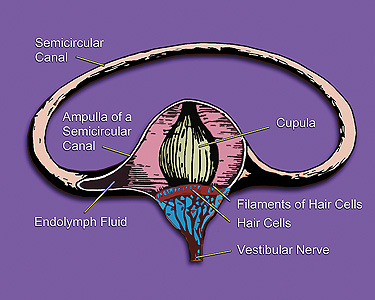
The cupula is the onion-shaped structure surrounded by endolymph in the ampulla.

The ampullary cupula, or cupula, is a structure in the vestibular system, providing the sense of spatial orientation.

The cupula is located within the ampullae of each of the three semicircular canals. Part of the crista ampullaris, the cupula has embedded within it hair cells that have several stereocilia associated with each kinocilium. The cupula itself is the gelatinous component of the crista ampullaris that extends from the crista to the roof of the ampullae. When the head rotates, the endolymph filling the semicircular ducts initially lags behind due to inertia. As a result, the cupula is deflected opposite the direction of head movement. As the endolymph pushes the cupula, the stereocilia is bent as well, stimulating the hair cells within the crista ampullaris. After a short time of continual rotation however, the endolymph's acceleration normalizes with the rate of rotation of the semicircular ducts. As a result, the cupula returns to its resting position and the hair cells cease to be stimulated. This continues until the head stops rotating which simultaneously halts semicircular duct rotation. Due to inertia, however, the endolymph continues on. As the endolymph continues to move, the cupula is once again deflected resulting in the compensatory movements of the body when spun.

With each rotation, the hair cells undergo either depolarization or hyperpolarization, depending on whether the endolymph moves them toward or away from their adjacent kinocilia, respectively. When the endolymph moves in the opposite direction, the direction of stimulation is reversed accordingly, from depolarization to hyperpolarization or vice versa. The corresponding signal is transmitted to the brain by the vestibulocochlear nerve (CN VIII).

In their natural orientation within the head, the cupulae are located on the medial aspect of the semicircular canals. In this orientation, the kinocilia rest on the posterior aspect of the cupula.

== Effects of alcohol ==
The Buoyancy Hypothesis posits that alcohol causes vertigo by affecting the neutral buoyancy of the cupula within the surrounding fluid called the endolymph. Linear accelerations (such as that of gravity) should not in theory effect a movement of the cupula when it is neutrally buoyant. The Buoyancy Hypothesis assumes that alcohol, with a different specific gravity from that of the cupula/endolymph, diffuses at different rates into the cupula and the surrounding endolymph. The result is a temporary density gradient between the cupula and endolymph, and a consequent (erroneous) sensitivity to linear accelerations such as that of gravity by a system normally signalling rotational accelerations. This sensation is commonly referred to as "the spins".
