= AIRES Flight 8250 =

2010 aviation accident in Colombia

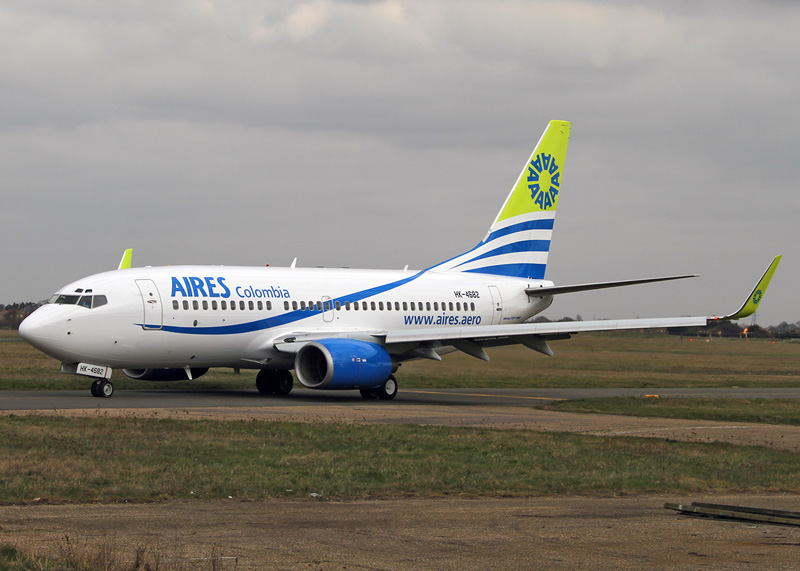
- HK-4682, the aircraft involved in the accident, pictured in March 2010

Accident
- Date: 16 August 2010
- Summary: Controlled flight into terrain during landing at night in bad weather primarily due to pilot error
- Site: Gustavo Rojas Pinilla International Airport, San Andrés, Colombia; 12°34′45″N 81°43′10″W

Aircraft
- Aircraft type: Boeing 737-73V
- Operator: AIRES
- IATA flight No.: 4C8250
- ICAO flight No.: ARE8250
- Call sign: AIRES 8250
- Registration: HK-4682
- Flight origin: El Dorado International Airport, Bogotá, Colombia
- Destination: Gustavo Rojas Pinilla International Airport, San Andrés, Colombia
- Occupants: 131
- Passengers: 125
- Crew: 6
- Fatalities: 2
- Injuries: 107
- Survivors: 129

AIRES Flight 8250 was a domestic scheduled passenger flight that on 16 August 2010 crashed on landing at night in poor weather on the Colombian island of San Andrés, killing two of the 131 people on board. The aircraft, an AIRES-operated Boeing 737-700, was arriving from the Colombian capital Bogotá when it heavily touched down short of the runway, breaking up in three sections.

The official investigation concluded that the crash was caused by the misjudgment by the crew of the aircraft's altitude during the last phase of the approach.

== History of the flight ==
Flight 8250 was operated by the local, privately owned Colombian airline AIRES. The aircraft was on a flight from Bogotá to the Colombian island of San Andrés, in the Caribbean. A popular tourist destination, San Andres Island is about 190 kilometres (120 mi; 100 nmi) east of the Nicaraguan coast.

The flight took off from Bogotá's El Dorado International Airport at 00:07 en route to Gustavo Rojas Pinilla International Airport with 125 passengers and six crew. Captain Wilson Gutierrez (43) was the pilot flying (PF) while First Officer Camilo Piñeros Rodriguez (25) was the pilot monitoring (PM).

=== Accident ===
The crash occurred as the aircraft landed at San Andrés at 1:49 am local Western Caribbean Time (UTC−05:00). The Boeing 737 broke up into three main sections. The impact occurred about 260 feet (80 m) before the start of the runway, with wreckage spread about another 328 feet (100 m). The aircraft skidded along the runway; the landing gear collapsed and one engine was ripped off the wing. The aircraft's nose and first eight rows of seating came to rest on the runway pointing in a different direction from the rest of the wreckage. Airport fire crews quickly doused a small fire that had started on a wing. As a result of the accident, the Regional Committee for Disaster Prevention and Attention (Spanish: Comité Regional de Prevención y Atención de Desastres) was mobilized.

== Aircraft ==
The aircraft involved was a Boeing 737-73V, (Note: The aircraft was a Boeing 737-700 model; Boeing assigns a unique code for each company that buys one of its aircraft, which is applied as a suffix to the model number at the time the aircraft is built, hence "737-73V".) registration HK-4682, with serial number (MSN) 32416, construction number 1270. The aircraft was built in 2003 and was first delivered to EasyJet registered as G-EZJU. It was then sold to AIRES in March 2010. Investigators said the day after the crash that the aircraft's maintenance log was up to date.

== Passengers and crew ==
Passenger fatality chart

There were contradictory reports as to how many people were aboard the aircraft. Reports range from 121 passengers and six crew members, 131 passengers and crew, and at least 127 people aboard. The report of 131 people was further broken down as 121 adult passengers and four minors. Reports the day after the accident settled on 131 people aboard: 125 passengers and six crew.

One early report stated that 114 people were injured in the crash, and that of 99 passengers taken to the Amor de Patria Hospital on San Andrés, only four had had major injuries. Reports a day later settled on a figure of 119 people being taken to local hospitals, mostly with minor injuries. Thirteen survivors, including four with serious injuries, were flown to Bogotá for treatment.

Initial reports indicated one fatality, an elderly lady dying of a heart attack. The final fatality count was two. Autopsy revealed that a 68-year-old woman had a ruptured aorta and ruptured liver. She died on the way to the hospital. The second fatality was a 10-year-old girl; she sustained substantial brain damage and died 16 days after the accident.

One report stated that the passenger list included six Americans, five Mexicans, four Brazilians, four Ecuadorians, and two Germans with the rest being Colombians. Another report stated there were three Americans aboard. A later report put the number of non-Colombians aboard as "at least 16."

== Investigation ==
Colombia's civil aviation authority, Special Administrative Unit of Civil Aeronautics, and the Colombian Air Force opened an investigation into the accident. The airport was closed as investigators examined the wreckage. The closure was expected to last until 06:00 on 17 August.

The aircraft reportedly crashed in bad weather while a storm was reported in the area, but not at the airport. The METAR (aviation routine weather observation message) report in force at the time of the accident indicated that the wind was from the east north east at 6 knots (11 km/h; 6.9 mph), visibility was good and that the runway was wet. (Note: Raw data from the METAR report were: SKSP 160500Z 07006KT 9999 FEW016 SCT200 29/26 A2990=Translated: Gustavo Rojas Pinilla International Airport date: 16th day of the month, time: 0500 zulu/UTC, wind: 070° at 6 kt, visibility: 10 km or more, few clouds at 1600 ft., scattered clouds at 20000 ft., temperature 29 °C, dew point 26 °C, altimeter setting (pressure) 29.90 inHg.) The aircraft "landed in the middle of an intense electrical storm" according to Colonel Barrero.

Passenger accounts the day after the crash detailed how the approach appeared to have been going normally, with the flight attendants having made the passengers ready for landing, when the crash occurred suddenly and without warning. The pilot did not report an emergency to the tower. There were conflicting reports over what caused the crash, suggesting that the landing was disrupted after the aircraft was hit by a downdraft, or struck by lightning. The pilot said that the aircraft was struck by lightning. Officials refused to comment on the reports of a lightning strike, although subsequent research proved that those were not the causes. No aircraft has had an accident caused by lightning since 1971. The airport was not fitted with equipment to detect wind shear, such as a Doppler radar.

Both the flight data and cockpit voice recorders were recovered from the wreckage. Based on the pattern of wreckage, investigators concluded that the aircraft had broken up on impact and not while in the air.

The U.S. National Transportation Safety Board sent a team to support the Colombian-led investigation as representatives of the manufacturer's state.

Almost one year after the accident, on 15 July 2011, the Security Council of Aeronáutica Civil concluded that the cause of the accident was the execution of the final approach below the glide path, due to an error of judgment by the crew who believed they were much higher. This is typical of a "black hole" illusion, which is experienced during a night approach to a low contrast runway environment surrounded by bright lights, aggravated by heavy rain. Aeronaútica Civil recommended retraining of the crew. The report also noted factors related to the captain's experience and training. Although the pilot had extensive experience, it had been primarily in turboprop aircraft. During interviews with investigators, the captain indicated that he used the runway threshold markings as a visual reference for landing, a technique appropriate for turboprops but which in a Boeing 737, with a cockpit positioned at a greater height, can lead the pilot to fly lower than normal without properly perceiving his position. The report also identified deficiencies in the airline's training program, as despite the captain having worked as a pilot for the company for more than twelve years, there were no records of corrective actions regarding his flight technique.

Although the accident was caused by human error, Aeronaútica representative Colonel Carlos Silva reminded that the purpose of the investigation was not to apportion blame but to prevent aircraft accidents that may occur in the future.

== In popular culture ==
The accident is featured in the fifth episode of Season 20 of Mayday, also known as Air Crash Investigation. The episode is titled "Runway Breakup."
