= Kinocilium =

Sensory hair in the inner ear

Details

Identifiers
- Latin: kinocilium
- TH: H1.00.01.1.01015
- FMA: 67323

A kinocilium is a special type of cilium on the apex of hair cells located in the sensory epithelium of the vertebrate inner ear. Contrasting with stereocilia, which are numerous, there is only one kinocilium on each hair cell. The kinocilium can be identified by its apical position as well as its enlarged tip.

Together with stereocilia, the kinocilium regulates depolarization and hyperpolarization of the hair cell, which is a neuron that can generate action potentials. When the stereocilia and kinocilium move further apart, the cell hyperpolarizes. When they move closer together, the cell depolarizes and may fire an action potential.

== Anatomy in humans ==
Kinocilia are found on the apical surface of hair cells and are involved in both the morphogenesis of the hair bundle and mechanotransduction. Vibrations (either by movement or sound waves) cause displacement of the hair bundle, resulting in depolarization or hyperpolarization of the hair cell. The depolarization of the hair cells in both instances causes signal transduction via neurotransmitter release.

=== Role in hair bundle morphogenesis ===
Each hair cell has a single, microtubular kinocilium. Before morphogenesis of the hair bundle, the kinocilium is found in the center of the apical surface of the hair cell surrounded by 20-300 microvilli. During hair bundle morphogenesis, the kinocilium moves to the cell periphery dictating hair bundle orientation. As the kinocilium does not move, microvilli surrounding it begin to elongate and form actin stereocilia. In many mammals, but not in humans, the kinocilium will regress once the hair bundle has matured.

=== Auditory system ===
The movement of the hair bundle, as a result of endolymph flow, will cause potassium channels on the stereocilia to open. This is mostly due to the pulling force stereocilia exerts on its neighboring stereocilia via interconnecting links that hold stereocilia together (usually from tallest to shortest) and this leads to the depolarization of the hair cell. This pattern of depolarization should not be confused with the more common depolarization which involves the influx of Na+ into the cell while K+ channels stay closed. Endolymph composition resembles that of the intracellular fluid (more K+ and less Na+) more closely compared to its counterpart, perilymph which resembles the extracellular fluid (more Na+ and less K+ compared to intracellular matrix). This depolarization will open voltage gated calcium channels. The influx of calcium then triggers the cell to release vesicles containing excitatory neurotransmitters into a synapse. The post-synaptic neurite then sends an action potential to the Spiral Ganglia of Gard. Unlike the hair cells of the crista ampullaris or the maculae of the saccule and utricle, hair cells of the cochlear duct do not possess kinocilia.

=== Vestibular apparatus ===
Kinocilia are present in the crista ampullaris of the semicircular ducts and the sensory maculae of the utricle and saccule. One kinocilium is the longest cilium located on the hair cell next to 40–70 stereocilia. During movement of the body, the hair cell is depolarized when the stereocilia move toward the kinocilium. The depolarization of the hair cell causes neurotransmitter to be released and an increase in firing frequency of cranial nerve VIII. When the stereocilia tilt away from the kinocilium, the hair cell is hyperpolarized, decreasing the amount of neurotransmitter released, which decreases the firing frequency of cranial nerve VIII.

== Anatomy in fish and frogs ==
The apical surface of a sensory fish hair cell usually has numerous stereocilia and a single, much longer kinocilium. Deflection of the stereocilia toward or away from the kinocilium causes an increase or decrease in the firing rate of the sensory neuron innervating the hair cell at its basal surface.

Hair cells in fish and some frogs are used to detect water movements around their bodies. These hair cells are embedded in a jelly-like protrusion called cupula. The hair cells therefore can not be seen and do not appear on the surface of skin of fish and frogs.

== See also ==
- Fish anatomy
- Utricle
- Otolith
