= Membranous labyrinth =

System of tubes and chambers in the inner ear of humans

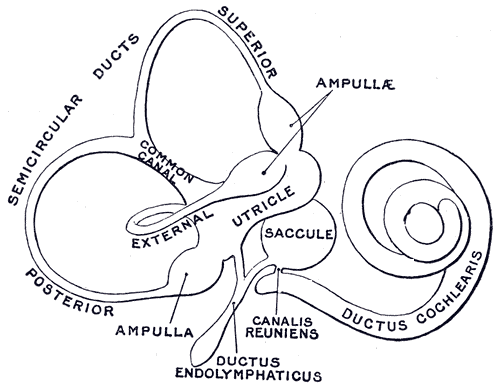
- The membranous labyrinth

Details
- Artery: labyrinthine artery

Identifiers
- Latin: labyrinthus membranaceus
- TA98: A15.3.03.059
- TA2: 6995
- FMA: 61022

The membranous labyrinth is a collection of fluid filled tubes and chambers in the inner ear which contain the receptors for the senses of equilibrium and hearing. It is lodged within the bony labyrinth and has the same general form; it is, however, considerably smaller and is partly separated from the bony walls by a quantity of fluid, the perilymph.

In certain places, it is fixed to the walls of the cavity.

The membranous labyrinth contains fluid called endolymph. The walls of the membranous labyrinth are lined with distributions of the cochlear nerve, one of the two branches of the vestibulocochlear nerve. The other branch is the vestibular nerve.

Within the vestibule, the membranous labyrinth does not quite preserve the form of the bony labyrinth, but consists of two membranous sacs, the utricle, and the saccule.

The membranous labyrinth is also the location for the receptor cells found in the inner ear.
