= Semicircular canals =

Organ located in innermost part of ear

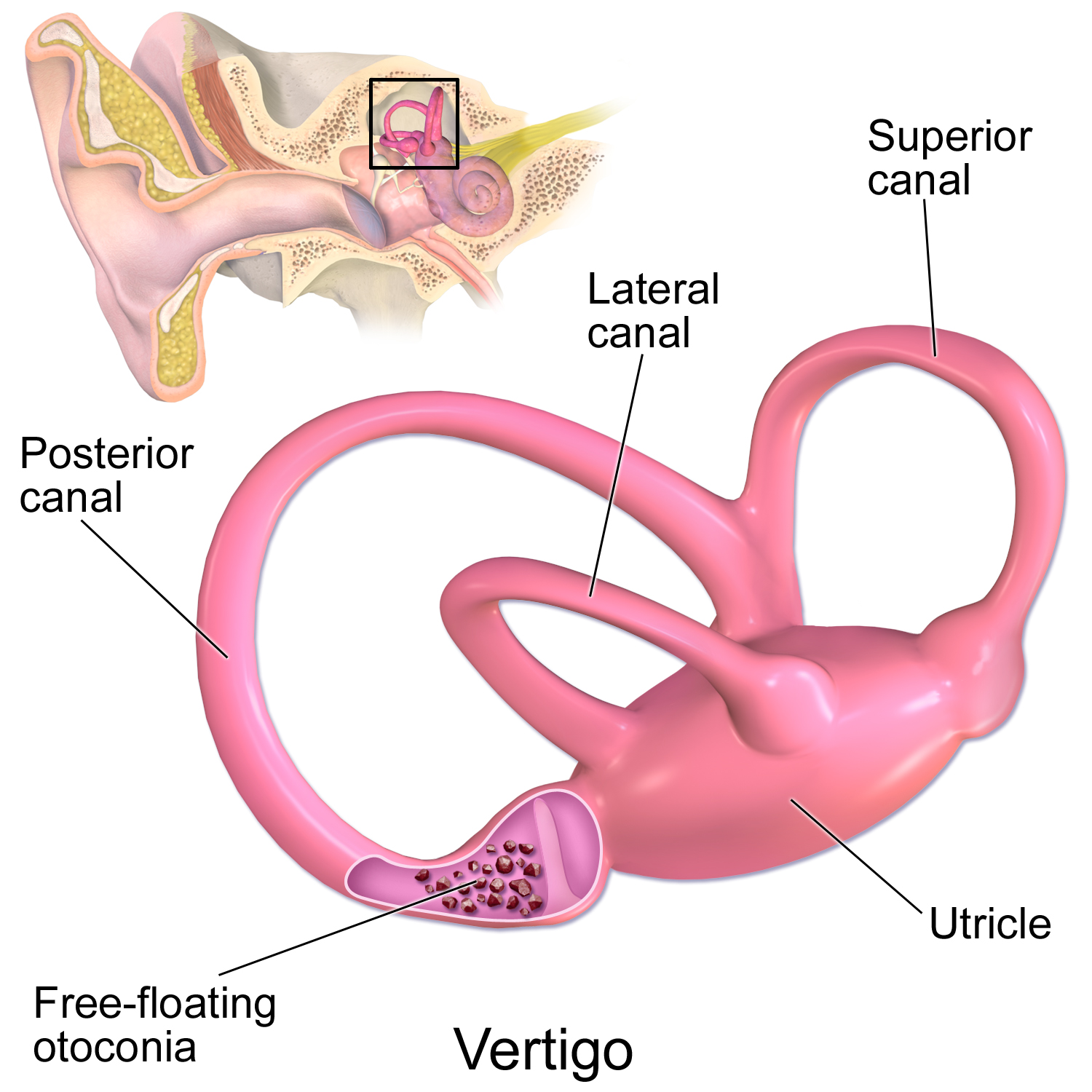
- Inner ear with semicircular canals

Details
- Artery: Stylomastoid artery, labyrinthine artery

Identifiers
- Latin: canalis semicircularis ductus semicircularis
- MeSH: D012665
- TA98: A15.3.03.015
- TA2: 6954
- FMA: 60186

The semicircular canals are three semicircular interconnected tubes located in the innermost part of each ear, the inner ear. The three canals are the lateral, anterior and posterior semicircular canals. They are the part of the bony labyrinth, a periosteum-lined cavity on the petrous part of the temporal bone filled with perilymph.

Each semicircular canal contains its respective semicircular duct, i.e. the lateral, anterior and posterior semicircular ducts, which provide the sensation of angular acceleration and are part of the membranous labyrinth—therefore filled with endolymph.

== Structure ==
The semicircular canals are a component of the bony labyrinth that are at right angles from each other and contain their respective semicircular duct. At one end of each of the semicircular ducts is a dilated sac called a membranous ampulla, which is more than twice the diameter of the ducts. Each ampulla contains an ampullary crest, the crista ampullaris which consists of a thick gelatinous cap called a cupula and many hair cells. The superior and posterior semicircular ducts are oriented vertically at right angles to each other. The lateral semicircular duct is about a 30-degree angle from the horizontal plane. The orientations of the ducts cause a different duct to be stimulated by movement of the head in different planes, and more than one duct is stimulated at once if the movement is off those planes. The lateral semicircular duct detects angular acceleration of the head when the head is turned and the anterior and posterior semicircular ducts detect vertical head movements when the head is moved up or down. When the head changes position, the endolymph in the ducts lags behind due to inertia and this acts on the cupula which bends the cilia of the hair cells. The stimulation of the hair cells sends the message to the brain that acceleration is taking place. The semicircular canals open into the vestibule by five orifices, one of the apertures being common to two of them.

Among species of mammals, the size of the semicircular canals is correlated with their type of locomotion. Specifically, species that are agile and have fast, jerky locomotion have larger canals relative to their body size than those that move more cautiously.

=== Lateral semicircular canal ===
The lateral semicircular canal (also known as horizontal or external semicircular canal) is the shortest of the three canals. Movement of fluid within its duct corresponds to rotation of the head around a vertical axis (i.e. the neck), or in other words, rotation in the transverse plane. This occurs, for example, when one turns the head from side to side (yaw axis).

It measures from 12 to 15 mm (0.47 to 0.59 in), and its arch is directed horizontally backward and laterally; thus each semicircular canal stands at right angles to the other two. Its ampullated end corresponds to the upper and lateral angle of the vestibule, just above the oval window, where it opens close to the ampullated end of the anterior semicircular canal; its opposite end opens at the upper and back part of the vestibule. The lateral canal of one ear is very nearly in the same plane as that of the other.

=== Anterior semicircular canal ===
The anterior semicircular canal (also known as superior semicircular canal) contains the part of the vestibular system that detects rotations of the head in around the lateral axis, that is, rotation in the sagittal plane. This occurs, for example, when nodding one's head (pitch axis).

It is 15 to 20 mm (0.59 to 0.79 in) in length, is vertical in direction, and is placed transversely to the long axis of the petrous part of the temporal bone, on the anterior surface of which its arch forms a round projection. It describes about two-thirds of a circle. Its lateral extremity is ampullated, and opens into the upper part of the vestibule; the opposite end joins with the upper part of the posterior semicircular canal to form the crus osseum commune, which opens into the upper and medial part of the vestibule.

=== Posterior semicircular canal ===
The posterior semicircular canal contains the part of the vestibular system that detects rotation of the head around the antero-posterior (sagittal) axis, or in other words, rotation in the coronal plane. This occurs, for example, when one moves the head to touch the shoulders, or when doing a cartwheel (roll axis).

It is directed superiorly and posteriorly, as per its nomenclature, nearly parallel to the posterior surface of the petrous part of the temporal bone. The vestibular aqueduct is immediately medial to it. The posterior semicircular canal is part of the bony labyrinth and its duct is used by the vestibular system to detect rotations of the head in the coronal plane. It is the longest of the three semicircular canals, measuring from 18 to 22 mm (0.71 to 0.87 in). Its lower or ampullated end opens into the lower and back part of the vestibule, its upper into the crus osseum commune.

=== Development ===
Findings from a 2009 study demonstrated a critical late role for bone morphogenetic protein 2 (BMP-2) in the morphogenesis of semicircular canals in the zebrafish inner ear. It is suspected that the role of BMP-2 in semicircular canal duct outgrowth is likely to be conserved between different vertebrate species.

Additionally, it has been found that the two semicircular canals found in the lamprey inner ear are developmentally similar to the superior and posterior canals found in humans, as the canals of both organisms arise from two depressions in the otic vesicle during early development. These depressions first form in lampreys between the 11 and 42 millimeter larval stages and form in zebrafish 57 hours post-fertilization

== Function ==
Cochlea and vestibular system

The semicircular ducts provide sensory input for experiences of rotary movements. They are oriented along the pitch, roll, and yaw axes. The lateral semicircular canal is oriented in the yaw axis, the anterior semicircular canal is oriented in the pitch axis, and the posterior semicircular canal is oriented in the roll axis.

Each duct is filled with a fluid called endolymph and contains motion sensors within the fluids. The base of each duct is enlarged, opening into the utricle, and has a dilated sac at one end called the membranous ampulla. Within the ampulla is a mound of hair cells and supporting cells called crista ampullaris. These hair cells have many cytoplasmic projections on the apical surface called stereocilia which are embedded in a gelatinous structure called the cupula. As the head rotates, the duct moves, but the endolymph lags behind owing to inertia. This deflects the cupula and bends the stereocilia within. The bending of these stereocilia alters an electric signal that is transmitted to the brain. Within approximately 10 seconds of achieving constant motion, the endolymph catches up with the movement of the duct and the cupula is no longer affected, stopping the sensation of acceleration. The specific gravity of the cupula is comparable to that of the surrounding endolymph. Consequently, the cupula is not displaced by gravity, unlike the otolithic membranes of the utricle and saccule. As with macular hair cells, hair cells of the crista ampullaris will depolarise when the stereocilia deflect towards the kinocilium. Deflection in the opposite direction results in hyperpolarisation and inhibition. In the lateral semicircular duct, ampullopetal flow is necessary for hair-cell stimulation, whereas ampullofugal flow is necessary for the anterior and posterior semicircular ducts.

This adjustment period is in part the cause of an illusion known as "the leans" often experienced by pilots. As a pilot enters a turn, hair cells in the semicircular ducts are stimulated, telling the brain that the aircraft, and the pilot, are no longer moving in a straight line but rather making a banked turn. If the pilot were to sustain a constant rate turn, the endolymph would eventually catch up with the ducts and cease to deflect the cupula. The pilot would no longer feel as if the aircraft was in a turn. As the pilot exits the turn, the semicircular ducts are stimulated to make the pilot think that they are now turning in the opposite direction rather than flying straight and level. In response to this, the pilot will often lean in the direction of the original turn in an attempt to compensate for this illusion. A more serious form of this is called a graveyard spiral. Rather than the pilot leaning in the direction of the original turn, they may actually re-enter the turn. As the endolymph stabilizes, the semicircular ducts stop registering the gradual turn and the aircraft slowly loses altitude until impact with the ground.

== History ==
Jean Pierre Flourens, by destroying the horizontal semicircular canal of pigeons, noted that they continue to fly in a circle, showing the purpose of the semicircular canals.

== Comparative anatomy ==
Hagfishes have only one semicircular canal but two ampullae, and it is generally believed to be homologous to the two vertical semicircular canals in all other vertebrates. Lampreys have two vertical semicircular canals, each with one ampulla. In lampreys, these are closely in contact with the underlying utricular part of the labyrinth. This is believed to be because the utricular part of the labyrinth is considerably enlarged. Lampreys have two ampulla with multiple branches and, unique among all vertebrates, two ciliated chambers studded with actively beating kinocilia. The Gnathostomata and most other vertebrates have 3 semicircular canals, each with one ampulla.

Galeaspids and osteostracans have 2 vertical semicircular canals, each with one ampulla. The labyrinth of osteostracans is unique in being expanded laterally and dorsally into several large, distally branching canals ("sel canals").

== See also ==
- Ear
- Inner ear

== Additional images ==
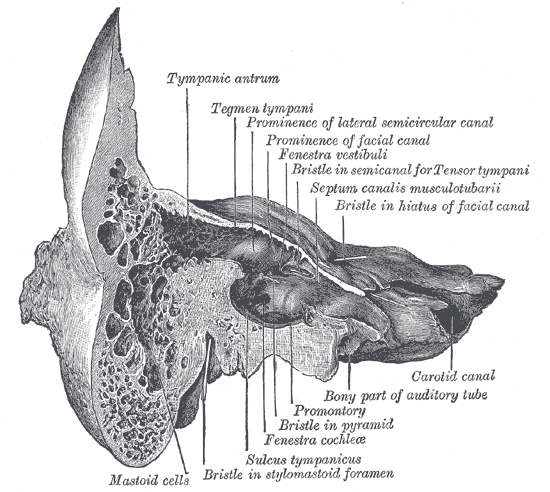
Coronal section of right temporal bone.

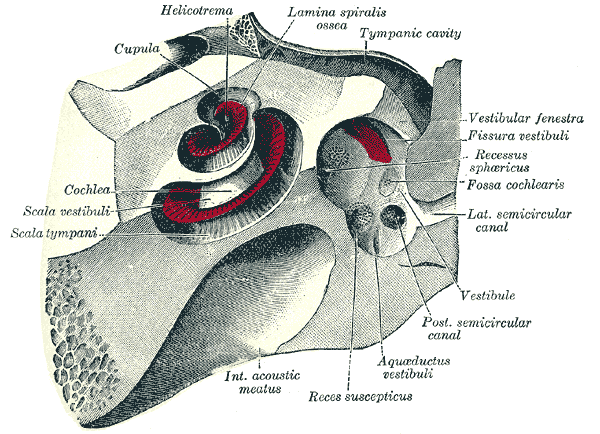
The cochlea and vestibule, viewed from above.

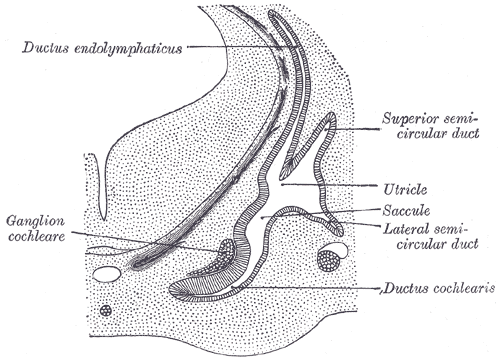
Transverse section through head of fetal sheep, in the region of the labyrinth. X 30.

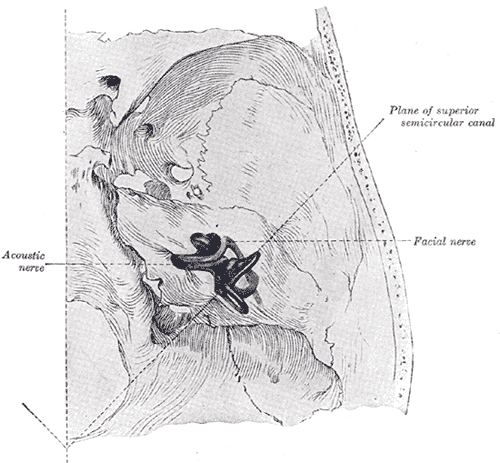
Position of the right bony labyrinth of the ear in the skull, viewed from above.
