= Crista ampullaris =

Sensory organ in the inner ear

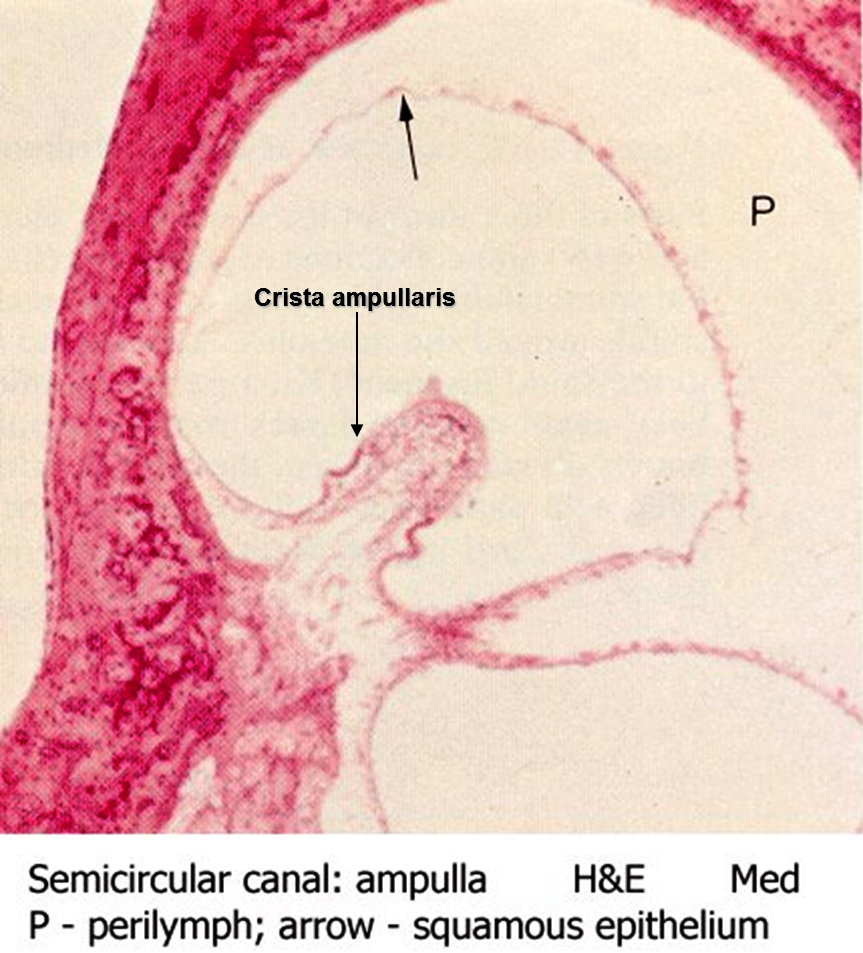
- Semicircular canal: ampulla at medium magnification with a hemotoxylin & eosin stain

Details
- Location: Semicircular canals of inner ear
- Function: Supply sensation of rotation

Identifiers
- Latin: crista ampullaris
- TA98: A15.3.03.088
- TA2: 7012, 7015, 7020
- FMA: 77714

The crista ampullaris is the sensory organ of rotation. They are found in the ampullae of each of the semicircular canals of the inner ear, meaning that there are three pairs in total. The function of the crista ampullaris is to sense angular acceleration and deceleration.

== Background ==
The inner ear comprises three specialized regions of the membranous labyrinth: the vestibular sacs – the utricle and saccule, and the semicircular canals, which are the vestibular organs, as well as the cochlear duct, which is involved in the special sense of hearing.

The semicircular canals are filled with endolymph due to its connection with the cochlear duct via the saccule, which also contains endolymph. It also contains an inner membranous sleeve that lines the semicircular canals. The canals also contain the crista ampullaris. The receptor cells located in the semicircular ducts are innervated by the eighth cranial nerve, the vestibulocochlear nerve (specifically the vestibular portion).

The crista ampullaris itself is a cone-shaped structure, covered in receptor cells called "hair cells". Covering the crista ampullaris is a gelatinous mass called the cupula. Upon angular acceleration (rotation), the endolymph within the semicircular duct deflects the cupula against the hair cells of the crista ampullaris. The hair cells thus respond by stimulating neurons that innervate them.
