= Stereocilia =

Cell structure

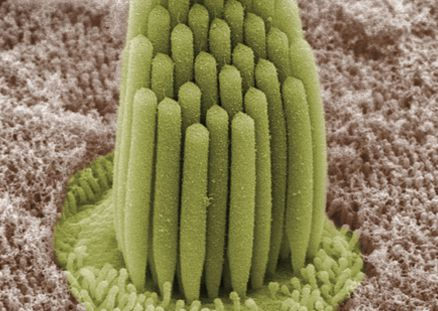
- Stereocilia of frog inner ear

Identifiers
- MeSH: D059547
- TH: H1.00.01.1.01013

Stereocilia (or stereovilli or villi) are non-motile apical cell modifications. They are distinct from cilia and microvilli, but are closely related to microvilli. They form single "finger-like" projections that may be branched, with normal cell membrane characteristics. They contain actin. Stereocilia are found in the vas deferens, the epididymis, and the sensory cells of the inner ear.

== Structure ==
Stereocilia are cylindrical and non-motile. They are much longer and thicker than microvilli, form single "finger-like" projections that may be branched, and have more of the characteristics of the cellular membrane proper. Like microvilli, they contain actin and lack an axoneme. This distinguishes them from cilia.

They do not have a basal body at their base since they do not contain microtubules. They may or may not be covered by a glycocalyx coating. They have no fixed arrangement, different to the structure present in kinocilium.

== Organs containing stereocilia ==
Stereocilia are found in:

- the vas deferens.
- the epididymis. Some consider epididymal stereocilia to be a variant of microvilli, rather than their own distinct type of structure.
- the sensory (hair) cells of the inner ear.
