= Bony labyrinth =

Bony structure of the inner ear

- Lateral view of right osseous labyrinth

- Interior view of right osseous labyrinth

Details

Identifiers
- Latin: labyrinthus osseus
- TA2: 692
- FMA: 60179

The bony labyrinth (also osseous labyrinth or otic capsule) is the rigid, bony outer wall of the inner ear in the temporal bone. It consists of three parts: the vestibule, semicircular canals, and cochlea. These are cavities hollowed out of the substance of the bone, and lined by periosteum. They contain a clear fluid, the perilymph, in which the membranous labyrinth is situated.

A fracture classification system in which temporal bone fractures detected by computed tomography are delineated based on disruption of the otic capsule has been found to be predictive for complications of temporal bone trauma such as facial nerve injury, sensorineural deafness and cerebrospinal fluid otorrhea. On radiographic images, the otic capsule is the densest portion of the temporal bone.

In otospongiosis, a leading cause of adult-onset hearing loss, the otic capsule is exclusively affected. This area normally undergoes no remodeling in adult life and is extremely dense. With otospongiosis, the normally dense enchondral bone is replaced by Haversian bone, a spongy and vascular matrix that results in sensorineural hearing loss due to compromise of the conductive capacity of the inner ear ossicles. This results in hypodensity on CT, with the portion first affected usually being the fissula ante fenestram.

The bony labyrinth is studied in paleoanthropology as it is a good indicator for distinguishing Neanderthals and modern humans.
