= Utricle (ear) =

Membranous labyrinth in the vestibule of ear

- Components of the inner ear including the utricle

Details
- Part of: Inner ear of vertebrates
- System: Balance

Identifiers
- Latin: utriculus
- TA98: A15.3.03.063
- TA2: 6999
- FMA: 61113

The utricle and saccule are the two otolith organs in the vertebrate inner ear. The word utricle comes from Latin uter 'leather bag'. The utricle and saccule are part of the balancing system (membranous labyrinth) in the vestibule of the bony labyrinth (small oval chamber). They use small stones and a viscous fluid to stimulate hair cells to detect motion and orientation. The utricle detects linear accelerations and head-tilts in the horizontal plane.

== Structure ==
The utricle is larger than the saccule and is of an oblong form, compressed transversely, and occupies the upper and back part of the vestibule, lying in contact with the recessus ellipticus and the part below it.

=== Macula ===
Macula of utricle
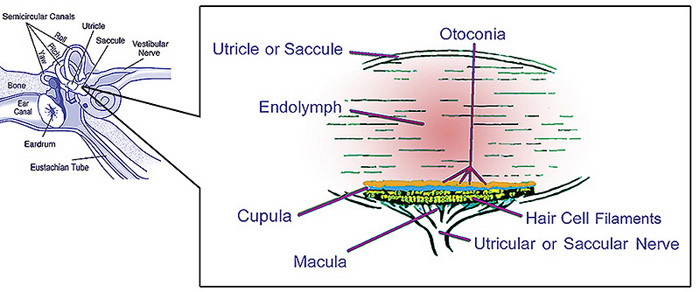
- illustration of otolith organs showing detail of utricle, otoconia, endolymph, cupula, macula, hair cell filaments, and saccular nerve

Details

Identifiers
- Latin: macula utriculi
- TA98: A15.3.03.063
- TA2: 6999
- FMA: 61113

The macula of utricle (macula acustica utriculi) is a small (2 by 3 mm) thickening lying horizontally on the floor of the utricle where the epithelium contains vestibular hair cells that allow a person to perceive changes in latitudinal acceleration as well as the effects of gravity; it receives the utricular filaments of the acoustic nerve.

The hair cells are mechanoreceptors which have 40 to 70 stereocilia and only one true cilium called a kinocilium. The kinocilium is the only sensory aspect of the hair cell and is what causes hair cell polarization. The tips of these stereocilia and kinocilium are embedded in a gelatinous layer, which together with the statoconia form the otolithic membrane. This membrane is weighted with calcium carbonate-protein granules called otoliths. The otolithic membrane adds weight to the tops of the hair cells and increases their inertia. The addition in weight and inertia is vital to the utricle's ability to detect linear acceleration, as described below, and to determine the orientation of the head. When the head is tilted such that gravity pulls on the statoconia, the gelatinous layer is pulled in the same direction also, causing the sensory hairs to bend. Labyrinthine activity responsible for the nystagmus induced by off-vertical axis rotation arises in the otolith organs and couples to the oculomotor system through the velocity storage mechanism.

=== Microanatomy ===
The cavity of the utricle communicates behind with the semicircular ducts by five orifices.

The ductus utriculosaccularis comes off of the anterior wall of the utricle and opens into the ductus endolymphaticus.

== Function ==
The utricle contains mechanoreceptors called hair cells that distinguish between degrees of tilting of the head, thanks to their apical stereocilia set-up. These are covered by otoliths which, due to gravity, pull on the stereocilia and tilt them. Depending on whether the tilt is in the direction of the kinocilium or not, the resulting hair cell polarisation is excitatory (depolarising) or inhibitory (hyperpolarisation), respectively. Any orientation of the head causes a combination of stimulation to the utricles and saccules of the two ears. The brain interprets head orientation by comparing these inputs to each other and to other input from the eyes and stretch receptors in the neck, thereby detecting whether only the head is tilted or the entire body is tipping. The inertia of the otolithic membranes is especially important in detecting linear acceleration. Suppose you are sitting in a car at a stoplight and then begin to move. The otolithic membrane of the macula utriculi briefly lags behind the rest of the tissues, bends the stereocilia backward, and stimulates the cells. When you stop at the next light, the macula stops but the otolithic membrane keeps going for a moment, bending the stereocilia forward. The hair cells convert this pattern of stimulation to nerve signals, and the brain is thus advised of changes in your linear velocity. This signal to the vestibular nerve (which takes it to the brainstem) does not adapt with time. The effect of this is that, for example, an individual lying down to sleep will continue to detect that they are lying down hours later when they awaken.

Unbent and at rest hairs in the macula have a base rate of depolarization of 90-100 action potentials a second. The brain suppresses this, and we ignore it and know that our body is stabilized. If the head moves or the body accelerates or decelerates, then bending occurs. Depending on the direction of bending, the hair cells will either be excited or inhibited resulting in either an increase or decrease in firing frequency of the hair cells.

The macula is also sensitive to linear acceleration as the inertia possessed by the statoconia can also shift the gelatinous layer during increases and decreases in linear velocity.

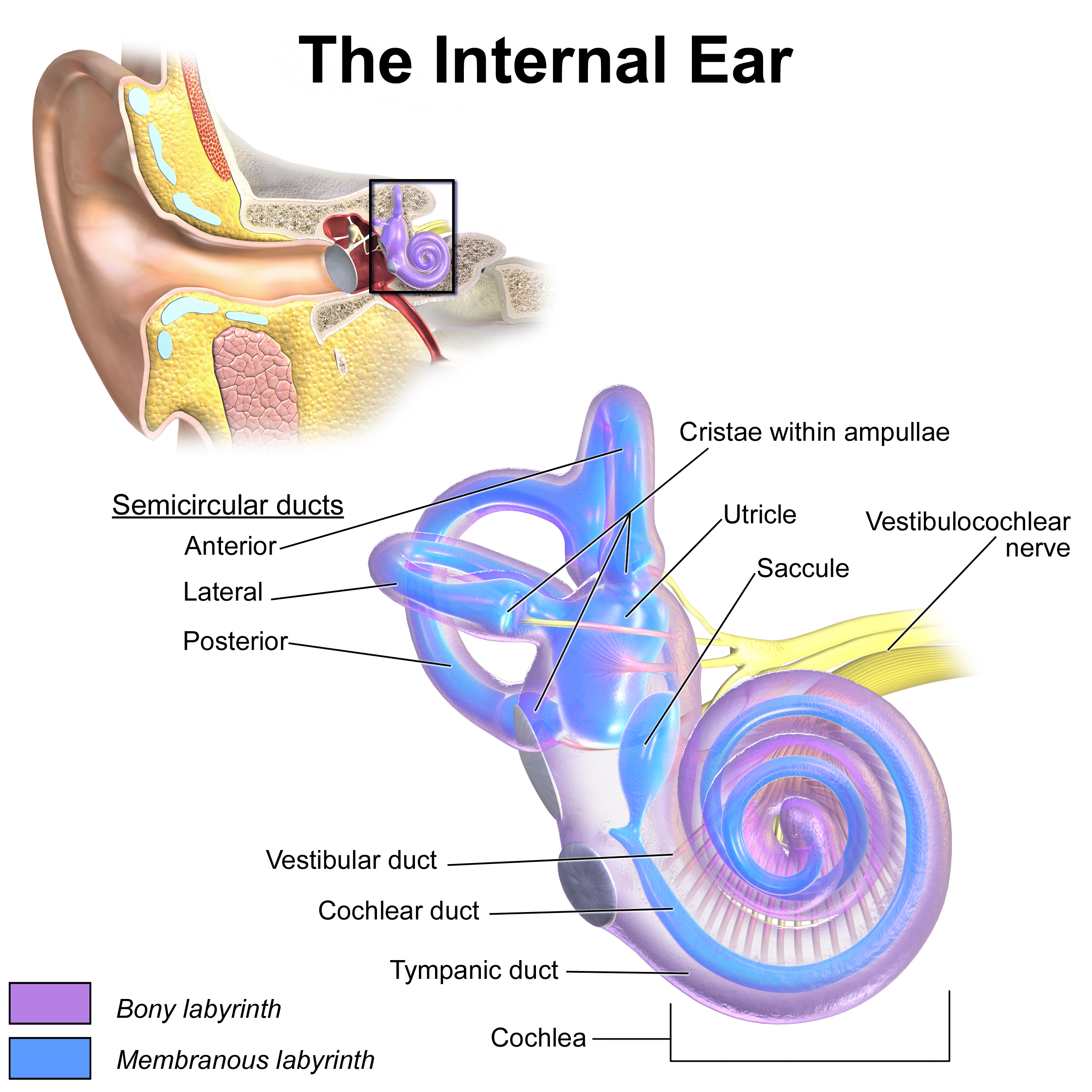
Inner ear, showing utricle near centre
