= Endolymph =

Inner ear fluid

- Cross-section of cochlea. (Endolymph is located in the cochlear duct - the light green region at the middle of the diagram.)

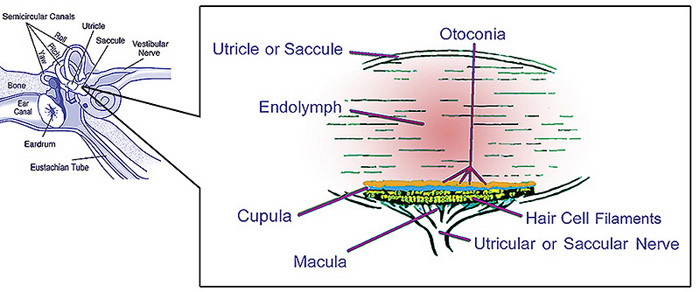
- illustration of otolith organs showing detail of utricle, ococonia, endolymph, cupula, macula, hair cell filaments, and saccular nerve

Details

Identifiers
- Latin: endolympha
- MeSH: D004710
- TA98: A15.3.03.061
- TA2: 6997
- FMA: 61112

Endolymph is the fluid contained in the membranous labyrinth of the inner ear. The major cation in endolymph is potassium, with the values of sodium and potassium concentration in the endolymph being 0.91 mM and 154 mM, respectively. It is also called Scarpa's fluid, after Antonio Scarpa.

== Structure ==
The inner ear has two parts: the bony labyrinth and the membranous labyrinth. The membranous labyrinth is contained within the bony labyrinth, and within the membranous labyrinth is a fluid called endolymph. Between the outer wall of the membranous labyrinth and the wall of the bony labyrinth is the location of perilymph.

=== Composition ===
Perilymph and endolymph have unique ionic compositions suited to their functions in regulating electrochemical impulses of hair cells.

The main component of this unique extracellular fluid is potassium, which is secreted from the stria vascularis. The high potassium content of the endolymph means that potassium, not sodium, is carried as the de-polarizing electric current in the hair cells. This is known as the mechano-electric transduction (MET) current.

The endolymphatic potential is quite high (80–120 mV in the cochlea), relative to other nearby fluids such as perilymph, due to its high concentration of positively charged ions. It is mainly this electrical potential difference that allows potassium ions to flow into the hair cells during mechanical stimulation of the hair bundle. Because the hair cells are at a negative potential of about −50 mV, the potential difference from endolymph to hair cell is on the order of 150 mV, which is the largest electrical potential difference found in the body.

The K/Na ratio in the endolymph varies across species. It ranges between the low-point of 3 in rock doves the high-point of 50−100 mV in guinea pigs. The endolymphatic potential relative to perilymph varies across species. In the poikilotherms, it may be less than 13 mV. In the birds, it is ~20 mV. In the eutherian mammals, it may reach up to 50−100 mV.

The carbonic anhydrase exists in the endolymph, and is used to chemically regulate the calcium carbonate found within the endolymphatic sac. This has the function of maintaining calcium homeostasis and acid–base homeostasis.

== Function ==
- Hearing: Cochlear duct: fluid waves in the endolymph of the cochlear duct stimulate the receptor cells, which in turn translate their movement into nerve impulses that the brain perceives as sound.
- Balance: Semicircular canals: angular acceleration of the endolymph in the semicircular canals stimulate the vestibular receptors of the endolymph. The semicircular canals of both inner ears act in concert to coordinate balance.

== Clinical significance ==
Disruption of the endolymph due to jerky movements (like spinning around or driving over bumps while riding in a car) can cause motion sickness. A condition where the volume of the endolymph is greatly enlarged is called endolymphatic hydrops and has been linked to Ménière's disease.

== Additional images ==
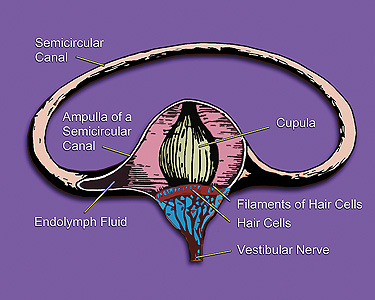
Inner ear illustration showing semicircular canal, hair cells, ampulla, cupula, vestibular nerve, & fluid

== See also ==
- Dark cell
- Perilymph
- Stria vascularis
- Organ of Corti
- Ménière's disease
