= Beatriz Morales-Nin =

Marine ecologist

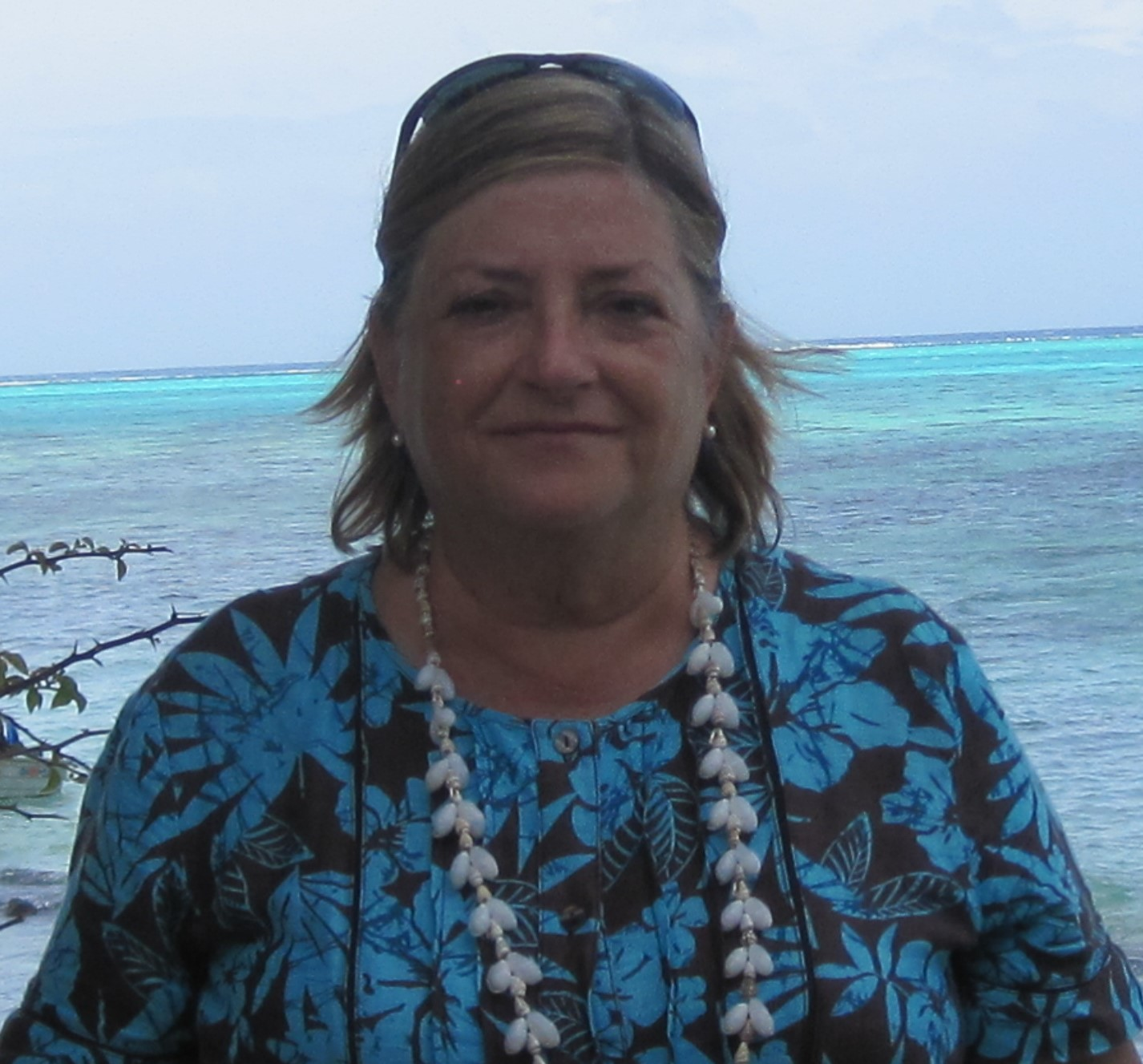
- Born: 19/12/1951
- Education: Universitat de Barcelona
- Known for: Sclerochronology
- Scientific career
- Workplaces: Mediterranean Institute for Advances Studies
- Thesis: (1984)

Beatriz Morales-Nin is a marine ecologist and expert in fish and sustainable management of fishery resources. She is currently a research professor at the Mediterranean Institute for Advanced Studies (IMEDEA). She is a leading Spanish expert in sclerochronology where her main field of research is fish otoliths.

== Biography ==
She studied at the Escuela Montessori and the Institut Montserrat in Barcelona. She began studying biology in 1970 at the University of Barcelona, where she graduated in 1978. Between 1972 and 1980, she was the mother of three children. She received a PhD in biology at the same university in 1984. She obtained the position of Senior Scientist at the Institute of Marine Sciences (ICM) in 1986, and in 1989 she began working at the Mediterranean Institute for Advanced Studies (IMEDEA) in Mallorca, where other prestigious scientists such as Anna Traveset work. She has been director of this institute for almost 10 years (2008 - 2016) and she is currently a research professor of the Spanish National Research Council (CSIC) at the same institute.

She was the first woman manager of the National Plan for Marine Science and Technology, and coordinator of a large network of European research funding bodies and several European projects.

== Research ==
During her professional career she has published more than 304 peer-reviewed articles with over 8300 citations, seven books and nineteen book chapters. She has participated in numerous oceanographic surveys from the tropics to the Antarctic. Her studies on fish otoliths have generated important information for the fisheries management, covering very specialized and local aspects (such as fish ageing), as well as more holistic studies about ecosystem changes driven by climate change.

In collaboration with the Laboratorio de Investigaciones Marinas y Acuicultura (LIMIA), she has studied the impact of artisanal fisheries on the seabed and marine species through different devices, aiming to reduce the impact of trammel nets.

Now she is working in fish stock identification based on otolith microchemistry and in coastal fisheries including recreational fisheries management.

== Awards and honors ==
- Awarded the “Premio Océanos 2020” -individual category- by the Atlantic Society of Oceanographers, in recognition for her contribution to marine sciences, as well as for her work in education and awareness for the protection of the sea.
- Received an award for her scientific career at the "6th International Otolith Symposium", held in Keelung, Taiwan (2018).

== Main publications ==
=== Books ===
- 1992. Determinación del crecimiento de peces óseos en base a la microestructura de los otolitos (Roma, Italia : Organización de las Naciones Unidas para la Agricultura y la Alimentación, Documento técnico de pesca)
- 2019. Handbook of fish age estimation protocols and validation methods. ICES Cooperative Research Repport
- 2020. La pesca recreativa, del ocio a la economía. An informative book on recreational fishing offering updated knowledge on its evolution, practices and current situation
