= Population structure =

Population structure may refer to many aspects of population ecology:

- Population structure (genetics), also called population stratification
- Population pyramid
- Age class structure
- F-statistics
- Population density
- Population distribution
- Population dynamics
- Population genetics
- Population growth
- Population size

== See also ==
- Demography
- Population model
- Category:Population
