= Age class structure =

Population assessment technique in fisheries and wildlife

Age class structure refers to the distribution of individuals in a population through different age groups. This is one tool used in fisheries and wildlife management as part of population assessment and modeling.

== Using Age Class Structure in Wildlife Management ==
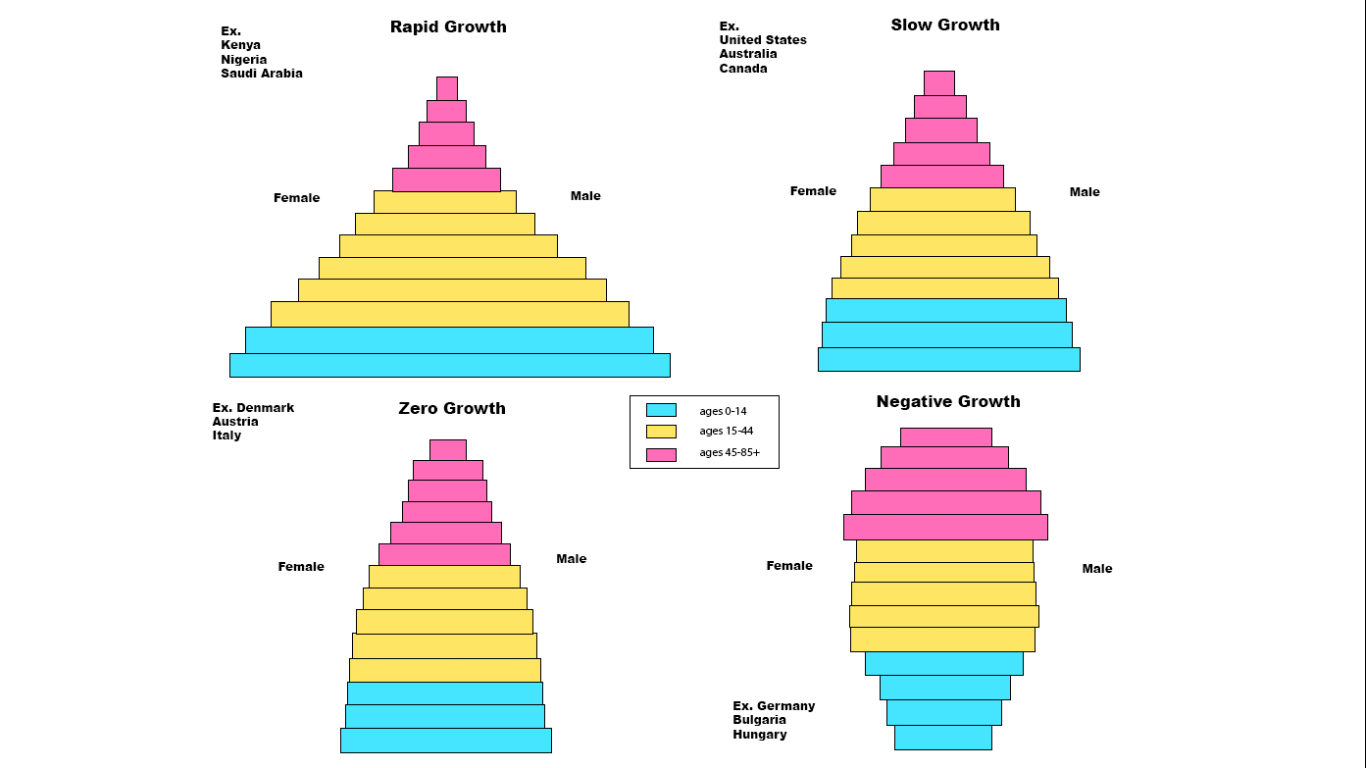
Population Pyramids, one way to visualize a population's age class structure.

Age class structures can be used to model population structures of many species including vertebrates, invertebrates, and vegetation. Factors that influence age class structures include birth rates, death rates, migration, and environmental stressors. These models allow for the prediction of growth or decline in a population based on current conditions or future management practices. Age class structures can be used to help focus management on a certain age class to obtain the desires population size outcomes.

Individuals in a population that are within a certain age range belong to the same class. These age classes count age like we usually do: individuals who are less than 1 year old are considered age class 0, those who are at least one year old but not yet two are age 1, and so on. When individuals are sorted into age classes like this, we can describe the population's age structure - meaning how many individuals are in each age group. Imagine a species where no one lives past 3 years old. This means all individuals would be either less than 1 year old (age class 0), 2 years old (age class 1), or 3 years old (age class 2). Therefore, if there are 20 individuals in total - 4 are newborns, 6 are 1-year-olds, and 10 are 2-year-olds - then the age structure would be 0.2 in age class 0, 0.3 in age class 1, and 0.5 in age class 2.

A stable age distribution happens when birth and death rates remain the same over time. This creates a steady, balanced number of individuals in each age group. The age class structure will look like a rectangle when shown in a population pyramid, meaning there is a similar number of individuals in each age range. An unstable age distribution happens when birth or death rates change significantly, causing the number of individuals in each age group to shift. This can make the population chart look uneven - like a triangle or an inverted triangle - showing that some age groups have many more or fewer individuals than others.

For example, when managing a population of white tail deer targeting a specific age and sex can alter the population pyramid type to either increase, decrease, or stabilize population growth. If you start off with a rapid growth age class structure, then targeting the juveniles who are not reproductive yet will help stabilize the population to a slower growth or no growth. This will make the number of juvenile females to closer the number of females who are aging out of the reproductive age. Targeting a specific sex will also alter the age class data. If looking to reduce the population then targeting hunting efforts on females will have a more impactful change. Removal of older individuals and males will increase the population by opening up resources for reproductive females and juveniles.

== Analyzing fisheries age class structure ==
Age can be determined by counting growth rings in fish scales, otoliths, cross-sections of fin spines for species with thick spines such as triggerfish, or teeth for a few species. Each method has its merits and drawbacks. Fish scales are easiest to obtain, but may be unreliable if scales have fallen off the fish and new ones grown in their places. Fin spines may be unreliable for the same reason, and most fish do not have spines of sufficient thickness for clear rings to be visible. Otoliths will have stayed with the fish throughout its life history, but obtaining them requires killing the fish. Also, otoliths often require more preparation before ageing can occur.

An example of using age class structure to learn about a population is a regular bell curve for the population of 1-5 year-old fish with a very low population for the 3-year-olds. An age class structure with gaps in population size like the one described earlier implies a bad spawning year 3 years ago in that species. Often fish in younger age class structures have very low numbers because they were small enough to slip through the sampling nets, and may in fact have a very healthy population. This could skew class structure data and result in imaccurate management techniques.

== Age Class Structure Influences Body-size Trends ==
Growing evidence suggests temporal shifts in body size, often studied with respect to climate and Bergmann's rule, may be explained by shifts in the age structure of a population. Because individuals change in size and shape as they age, changes in age class structure can result in shifts in the morphospace of a population reflecting either a greater proportion of older (and larger) or younger (and smaller) individuals. Research on Canada Lynx and American Marten suggests that age structure is an important determinant of both skull size and impacts overall population trends

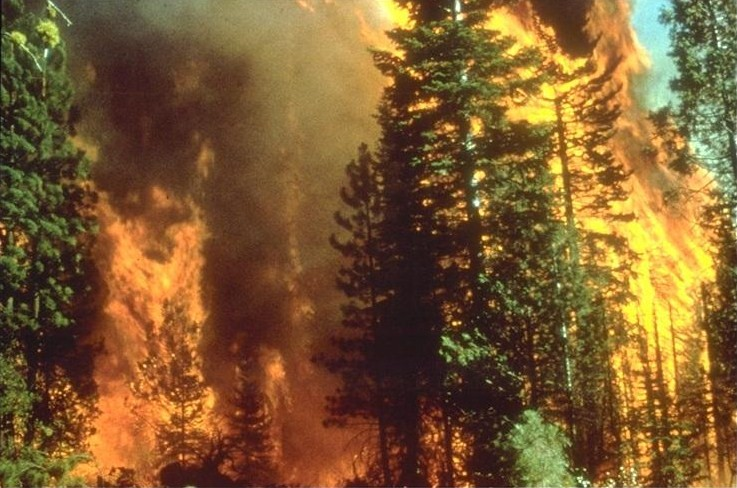
Age class structures can be used to determine when wildfires occurred within a forest population.

== Age Class Structures After Wildfires ==
Aging trees is performed through several methods, the first being to count the trees annual growth rings and the second is to calculate using the growth factor and circumference. After a wildfire, depending on the severity, some of the forest will experience a loss in the population of several species. This interference can drastically alter an age class structure. If the fire was low intensity and burned low to the ground killing only young trees, then the age structure would be heavily skewed towards having many older mature trees and very few young trees. Wild fires can alter age class structures by removing individuals in certain age classes and altering the type of population pyramid the species is experiencing. This shift in age class structures can also help predict how quickly the forest will rebound from the disturbance.

== See also ==
- Identification of aging in fish
- Population pyramid
- Population dynamics of fisheries
