= Gluteus (genus) =

Gluteus minimus Temporal range: Late Devonian, 382.7–360 Ma Frasnian-Famennian

Scientific classification
- Kingdom: Animalia
- Phylum: incertae sedis
- Genus: †Gluteus Davis & Semken, 1975
- Species: †G. minimus

Binomial name
- †Gluteus minimus Davis & Semken, 1975

Fossil from the Upper Devonian of Iowa

Gluteus minimus is an extinct species of animal from the Late Devonian (Frasnian-Famennian) of Iowa that is the only species within the genus Gluteus. It was first collected in 1902, but only described in 1975 and the holotype is SUI 34978-91. Each animal appears as a bi-lobed lens up to 11 mm × 8 mm (0.43 in × 0.31 in), and almost all specimens share the same slight asymmetry. The species is of uncertain affinities, having been variously thought of as either fish teeth, some sort of fish scales, brachiopods, or otoliths.

== Collection history ==
Specimens of G. minimus were first collected by Stuart Weller in 1902, from the Maple Mill Shale near Maple Mill on the English River, Washington County, Iowa. The Upper Devonian Maple Mill Shale appears as a series of shale lenses which are rich in fossils, including conodonts, fish remains, possible sporocarps, gastropods, brachiopods, bivalves, and scolecodonts.

At a similar time to Weller's collections, Charles Rochester Eastman collected specimens from the Kinderhook Beds at Burlington, Des Moines County, Iowa. C. H. Belanski collected specimens 30 years later from the Lime Creek Formation in Floyd County, Iowa. Thousands of specimens have since been collected from the Maple Mill Shale and nearby sites, and two have been found in a well at Columbus City, Iowa.

== Description ==
Gluteus minimus was formally described in a paper in the journal Science in 1975 by Richard Arnold Davis and Holmes A. Semken Jr., of the University of Cincinnati and the University of Iowa, respectively. They studied more than 3,200 specimens, many of which were deposited at the University of Iowa's Department of Geology and the University of Cincinnati Geology Museum. They referred to the fossils as "horse collars", a name which had been used colloquially among university staff.

Gluteus minimus appears as lenticular (lens-shaped), bilobed fossils, with a size up to 11 mm × 8 mm (0.43 in × 0.31 in). In a sample of 400 specimens, the median diameter was 7.4 mm (0.29 in), with a range of 4.5–10.0 mm (0.18–0.39 in). Each fossil has two dissimilar surfaces – one smooth with one or rarely two furrows, and one with conspicuous "growth lines", parallel with the outer edge of the fossil. The overall shape is broadly symmetrical, but the furrow is almost always on the same side of the "re-entrant" (the cleft between the two halves). Opposite the re-entrant is a "salient", which separates two indentations in the margin.

The specimens of G. minimus are made of apatite, comprising 56% calcium oxide, 39% phosphate, 3.5% fluoride, and 1.5% organic carbon. Davis and Semken could not rule out the possibility that the apatite was introduced after deposition, since the shell of an animal similar to Bellerophon in the same sediments had been replaced with apatite. No amino acids could be recovered.

== Classification ==
The identity of Gluteus minimus has been enigmatic since its original discovery. Weller's specimens collected in 1902 are labelled "Fish remains?" in his sister's handwriting, Burlington's specimens are labelled "Cone scales?", and Belanski described them as "apparently dermal ossifications of some fish". While Gluteus minimus has been interpreted as either a fish tooth or a brachiopod, it cannot be confidently placed in any phylum, and more recent 3D analyses suggest it may be an otolith or statolith from a Devonian free-swimming animal rather than an entire organism or the shell of an organism. In 2011, specimens from the same fossil strata in Iowa, and nearly identical to the illustrations of Gluteus were identified as teeth of the cochliodont "shark", Synthetodus trisulcatus.
