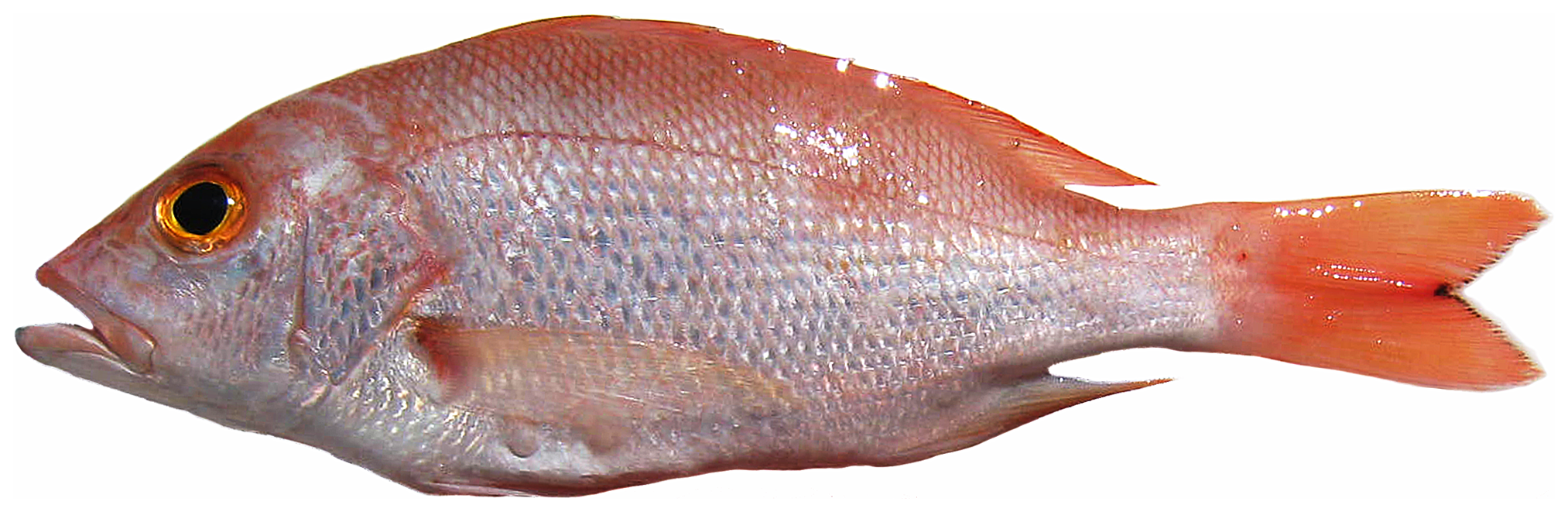

Scientific classification
- Kingdom: Animalia
- Phylum: Chordata
- Class: Actinopterygii
- Order: Acanthuriformes
- Family: Lutjanidae
- Genus: Lutjanus
- Species: L. purpureus

Binomial name
- Lutjanus purpureus (Poey, 1867)

Synonyms
- Mesoprion purpureus Poey, 1867

= Lutjanus purpureus =

Species of fish

Lutjanus purpureus, the southern red snapper or Caribbean red snapper, is a species of marine ray-finned fish, a snapper belonging to the family Lutjanidae. It is native to the western Atlantic Ocean as well the Caribbean Sea.

== Taxonomy ==
Lutjanus purpureus was first formally described in 1867 as Mesoprion purpureus by the Cuban zoologist Felipe Poey, no type locality was given but it is most probably Cuba. It is not clear what species Poey was describing as he may have based his description on a painting with am ambiguous subject. It has been treated as a synonym of the Northern red snapper (Lutjanus campechanus). The specific name purpureus means “purple”, reinforcing the ambiguity of Poey's description, as this is not a purple coloured fish. Past authors have referred to this species as Lutjanus aya but it has been shown that Bodianus aya Bloch, 1790 is not a snapper, but is more likely to be a drum.

== Description ==
Lutjanus purpureus has a moderately deep, compressed body with a relatively short head which has a rounded dorsal profile. It has a short, rather blunt snout with two pairs of nostrils, both simple holes. It has a large eye and a weakly developed incision and knob on the serrated preoperculum. The vomerine teeth are arranged in a chevron or crescent shaped patch with a short rearwards extension. The dorsal fin contains 10 spines and 14 soft rays while the anal fin has 3 spines and 8-9 soft rays, the anal fin is pointed in individuals greater than 5 cm (2.0 in). The long pectoral fin extends as far as the anus and has 17 rays. The caudal fin strongly emarginate with its upper lobe being slightly longer than the lower lobe. This species attains a maximum total length of 100 cm (39 in), although 65 cm (26 in) is more typical, and a maximum published weight of 10 kg (22 lb). The back and upper flanks are deep red while the lower flanks and abdomen are pinkish, sheened with silver. The fins are largely red and there may be a small dark spot on the upper base of the pectoral fin. Juveniles have with a round black spot on the upper flanks underneath the front of the soft rayed part of the dorsal fin, as the fish grows this fades and eventually disappears.

== Distribution and habitat ==
Lutjanus purpureus Is found in the western Atlantic Ocean. It occurs throughout much of the Caribbean Sea from Cuba in the north southwards to northeastern Brazil. It is most numerous over the continental shelf from Honduras to the Guianas. It is less abundant off the islands of the Greater and Lesser Antilles where it is restricted to deeper water. This species is found in areas of rocky substrates at depths between 30 and 160 m (98 and 525 ft), commonest at depths from 70 and 120 m (230 and 390 ft). Juveniles prefer sand or mud substrates.

== Biology ==
Lutjanus purpureus is predatory, its diet mostly comprises fishes, shrimps, crabs, cephalopods and zooplankton. Spawning takes place during the spring and summer. They have an estimated maximum lifespan of 12–18 years.

== Fisheries ==
Lutjanus purpureus is not of great importance to commercial fisheries despite being regarded as a good quality food fish. It is mainly caught using long lines, hand lines and bottom trawls, it is also taken with gillnets. There have been reports of ciguatera poisoning in humans following consumption of this species.
