= Age determination in fish =

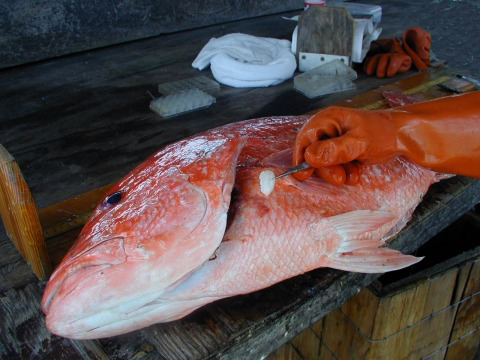
Removing an otolith from a red snapper to determine its age

Knowledge of fish age characteristics is necessary for stock assessments, and to develop management or conservation plans. Size is generally associated with age; however, there are variations in size at any particular age for most fish species making it difficult to estimate one from the other with precision. Therefore, researchers interested in determining a fish age look for structures which increase incrementally with age. The most commonly used techniques involve counting natural growth rings on the scales, otoliths, vertebrae, fin spines, eye lenses, teeth, or bones of the jaw, pectoral girdle, and opercular series. Even reliable aging techniques may vary among species; often, several different bony structures are compared among a population in order to determine the most accurate method.

== History ==
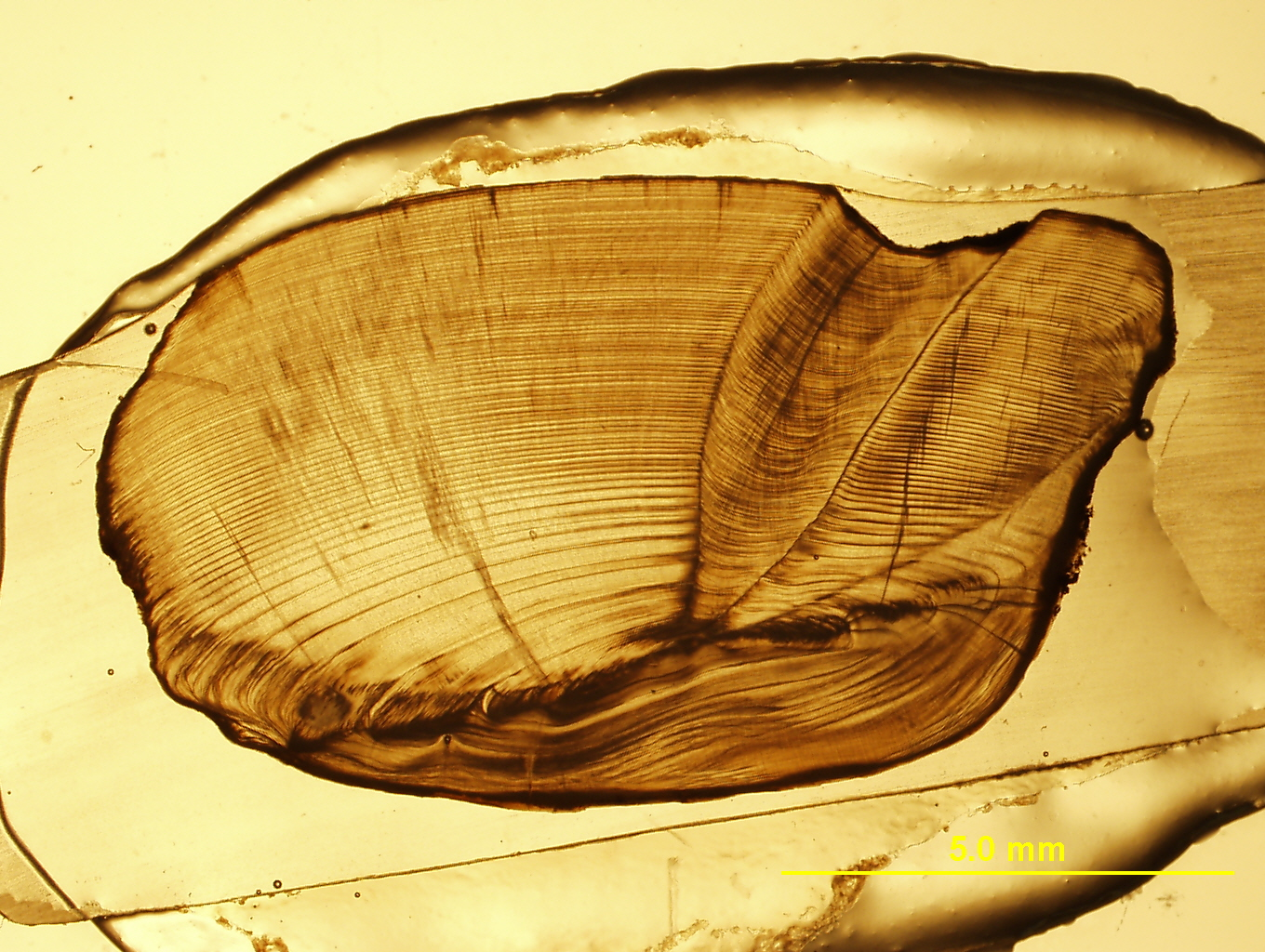
Sagittal otolith from a 74-year-old freshwater drum, Aplodinotus grunniens

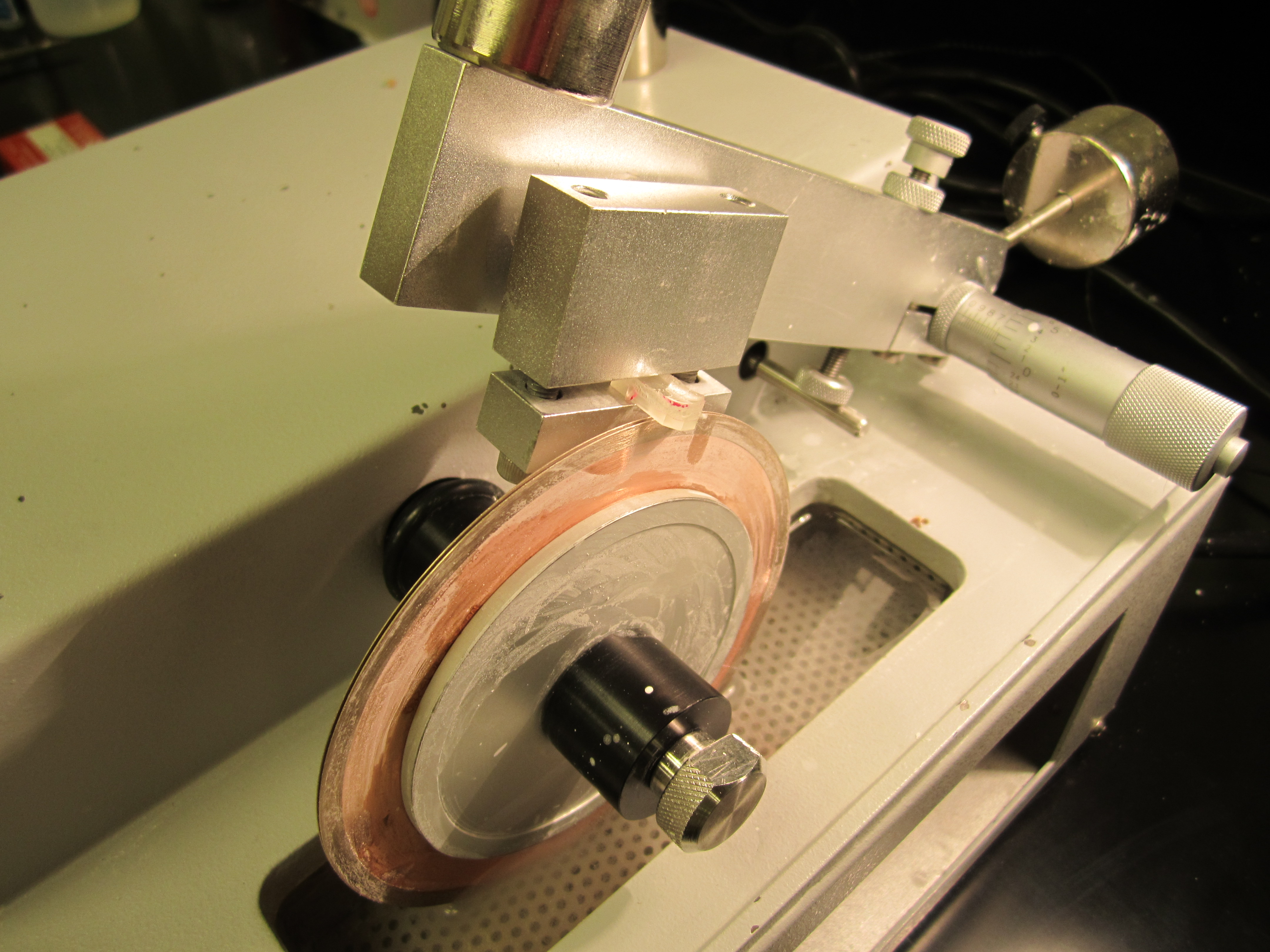
Fish otolith on a sectioning saw

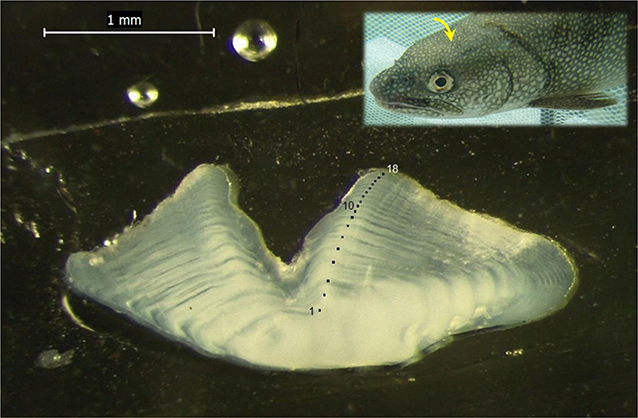
Cross-section of an otolith from an 18-year-old lake trout. The black dots mark the edges of its rings. Rings for years 1, 10, and 18 are labeled. The yellow arrow shows its approximate location in a lake trout.

Aristotle (ca. 340 B.C.) may have been the first scientist to speculate on the use of hard parts of fishes to determine age, stating in Historica Animalium that “the age of a scaly fish may be told by the size and hardness of its scales.” However, it was not until the development of the microscope that more detailed studies were performed on the structure of scales. Antonie van Leeuwenhoek developed improved lenses which he went use in his creation of microscopes. He had a wide range of interests including the structure of fish scales from the European eel (Anguilla anguilla) and the burbot (Lota lota), species which were previously thought not to have scales. He observed that the scales contained "circular lines" and that each scale had the same number of these lines, and correctly inferred that the number of lines correlated to the age of the fish. He also correctly associated the darker areas of scale growth to the season of slowed growth, a characteristic he had previously observed in tree trunks. Leeuwenhoek's work went widely undiscovered by fisheries researchers, and the discovery of fish aging structures is widely credited to Hans Hederström (e.g., Ricker 1975). Hederström examined the vertebrae of pike (Esox lucius) and concluded that each contained growth rings which could then be used to determine the fish's age. In 1859, Robert Bell reported that one could use these growth rings to reliably determine the age of all fish after examination of sucker (Catastomus sp.) vertebrae and yellow perch (Perca flavescens) scales that he raised in a pond for two years showed "two rings or circles."

In 1898, more than 200 years after Leewenhoek's original insights of scale age structure, this subject was given a thorough review by C. Hoffbauer. Hoffbauer studied commercially grown carp scale growth patterns throughout the year. He noted that during the season of growth, the concentric rings (annuli) were easily discernible and widely spaced; however, as growth slowed and ceased during the winter months the rings were very compact, then resumed normal spacing as the growth season began again. His work convinced other researchers that these aging techniques could be used on marine species. Shortly after Hoffbauer's findings were published, structures other than scales were examined for utility of aging fish. Johannes Reibisch, working for the Commission of Scientific Investigation of German Seas at Kiel, attempted to use Hoffbauer's techniques to age plaice (Plueronectes platessa) but found it difficult to accurately discern annuli. He decided to study a different structure and in 1899 he published the first procedures using otoliths as an aging structure. A fellow scientist also with the German Commission at Kiel, Friedriche Heincke, also frustrated with difficult scale annuli, further studied other structures to age fish. He discovered annuli in the vertebrae, opercula, and pectoral girdle and published his findings in Heicke 1905.

The works of Hoffbauer, Reibisch, and Heinke are most often cited as establishing scales, otoliths, and bony structures as viable aging structures. Further, Tereschenko (1913) is credited as the first to use cleithra aging techniques on roach; and Holtzmayer (1924) with using fin rays to age sturgeon.

== Analysis of ages ==
Not long after Hoffbauer's and Reibisch's findings were published, aging was used in fishery assessments of the early 1900s. One of the first to focus on the applications of fish aging was the Norwegian fisheries scientist Johan Hjort. Focusing on fish scales, Hjort developed an extensive aging program collecting statistics on birth rate, age-distribution and migration. Hjort's research elicited debate from the biomathematician D'Arcy Wentworth Thompson, who later rescinded his criticisms. His research otherwise received glowing praise and would lead to fundamental changes in the way fish populations were studied and managed.

== Aging structures and techniques ==
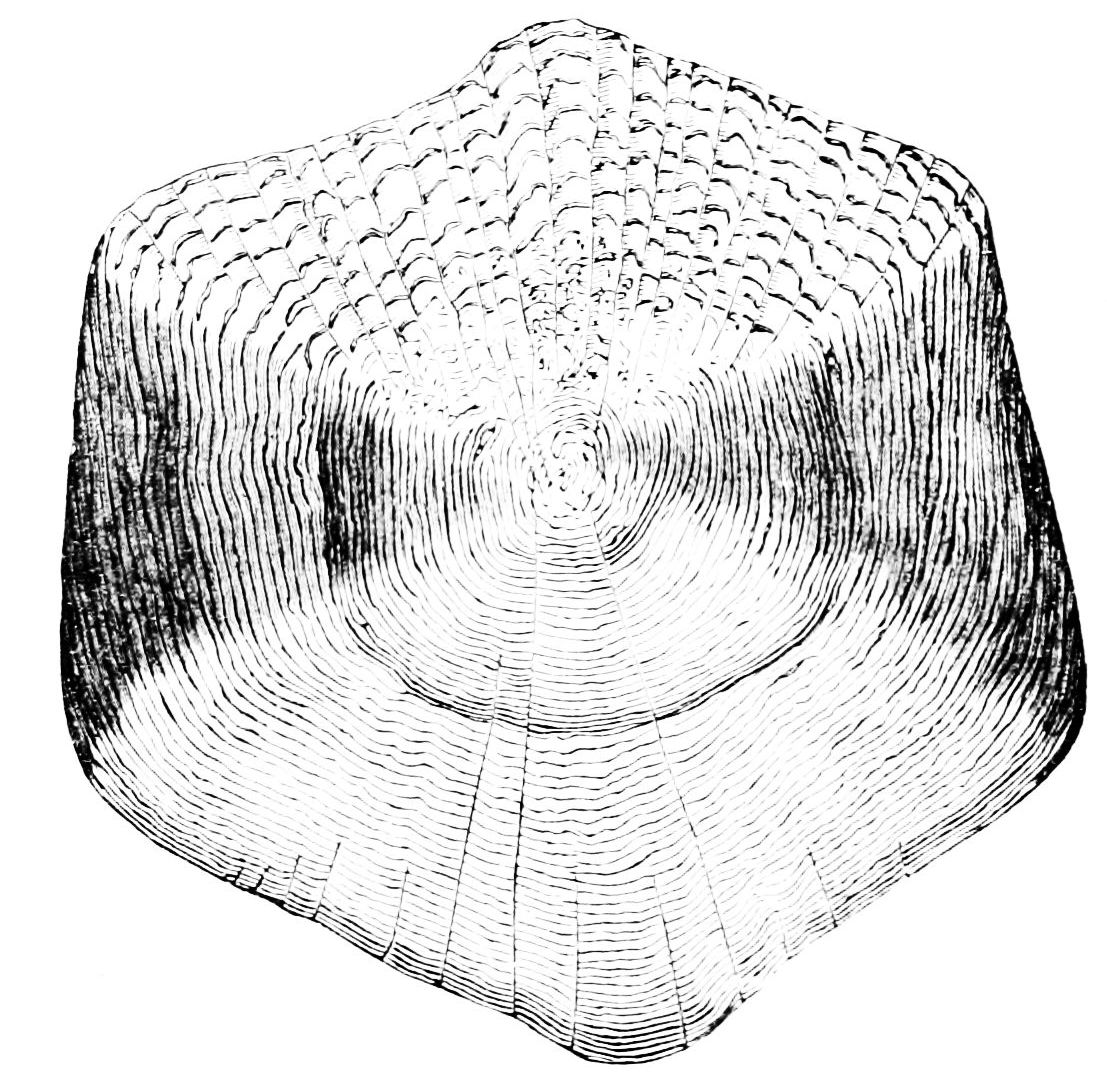
Scale of a common carp

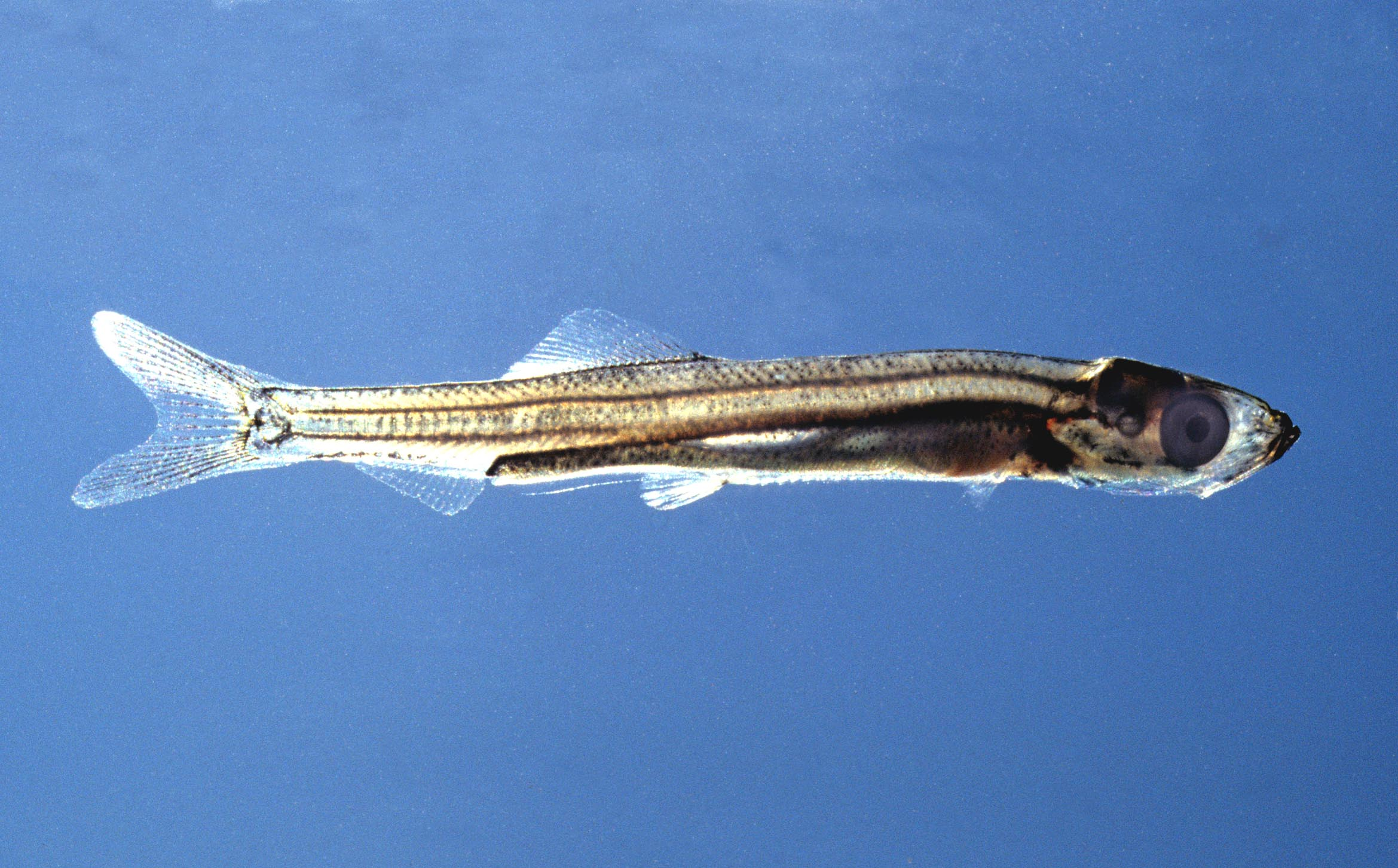
Still transparent juvenile herring. The otoliths are visible left of the eye.

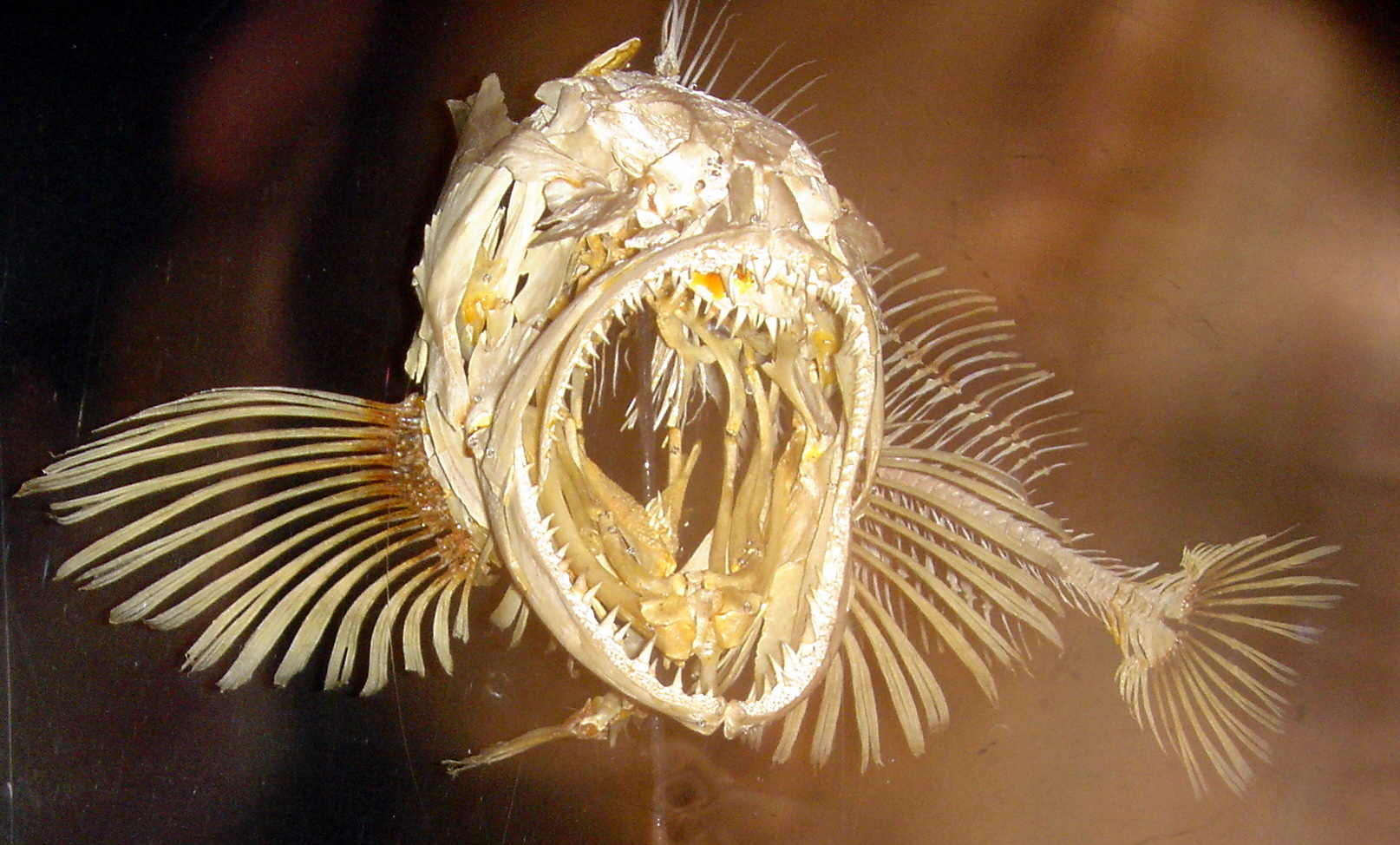
Some bony structures such as fin rays and pectoral spines can be harvested without sacrificing the fish, unlike otoliths.

=== Scales ===
Scales are the most widely used aging structure in North America because of their non-lethal ease of collection. Counting the number of annuli (rings) on a scale provides the fish age and the spacing between rings is proportional to the growth of the fish. (Note: Some examples and uses of scale aging can be found in "Fish scales tell a story..." from the Delaware Division of Fish & Wildlife.) The ease of collection of this aging structure is not without its tradeoffs, as the major bias of scales used as an age estimation structure is their tendency to underestimate the age of older fish.

=== Otoliths ===
Fish otoliths are the earbones of a teleost (bony) fish and are present in pairs; fish have three pairs, the lapilli, the sagittae, and the astersci. These three pairs of otoliths in teleost fishes differ in form, function, size, shape, and ultrastructure. Otoliths function in fishes' hearing, equilibrium, and acceleration. Otolith microstructural studies exist for 50 families and 135 species of fish and squid. The size and shape of otoliths vary widely depending on the species. Without prior experience, it is difficult to predict the exact size, shape, and position of a given species. There is also interspecies variation, especially ontogenetic changes as a fish experiences growth. Otoliths are generally easier to read than scales and are more accurate, being internal and never reabsorbing like scales. Often the sagittae are analyzed for growth, as they are the largest of the three otoliths and therefore easiest to remove. Generally, otoliths <300 mm can be analyzed intact. When >300 mm, otoliths contain too much three-dimensional material and must be sectioned to analyze it more clearly. The steps to preparing otoliths are to 1. Embed or mount the otolith 2. Section and polish 3. Store the otolith section safely.

=== Calcified or bony structures ===
The choice of calcified or bony structures for aging varies among species, a structure used in one species may not be the same structure used in another. Not all bony structures lay down growth rings equally. Such bony structures used for age estimation are vertebrae, opercula, fin rays, pectoral spines, among others. Bony structures are often compared to otoliths as far as accuracy. Some bony structures such as fin rays and pectoral spines may be harvested without sacrificing the specimen, unlike otoliths. Preparation for bony parts involves first cleaning by soaking the structure in bleach or boiling to remove soft tissues. Depending on the size, shape, and structure of the calcified aging part it may be examined whole or more likely, sectioned. Estimation of annuli is similar to that of otoliths.

== Analyzing age class structure ==
Fish ages are often examined along with measurements of length and weight which combined can provide information on stock composition, age at maturity, life span, mortality, and production. Other purposes of performing age structure analysis are growth analysis, population dynamics estimates and resource management. Data from a particular study can delineate individuals into specific age classes. Exploited species often have the older, larger individuals removed from the population because they are the first removed by fishers leaving the younger smaller individuals. This effect may have serious consequences for that population. By performing age analysis studies we can identify these types of effects as well their implications to the status of the population.

Age structure analysis can be performed by the above methods which are the most direct, through estimates of length and weight, or a combination of both. Once the data is acquired and individuals are arranged in their respective age classes, one can attempt to attribute trends to the age distribution. For example, in Jaurequizar and Guerrero (2009), the researchers were examining the age structure of a population as a function of a period of four years which experienced varying environmental conditions (two average years to El Niño and La Niña years). The dominant age classes were affected by the environmental conditions.

While the age analysis has been around in some form for over 250 years, there has only more recently been a rapid advance in techniques and uses of this information. There are still efforts required to further validate these aging methods and to determine new techniques. As the population of the world's fish continues to decline due to exploitation age structure analysis data will only become more important as we to try understand multiple effects on population dynamics.

== Bibliography ==
- Helfman, G.S., Collette, B.B., and Facey, D.E. The Diversity of Fishes. Blackwell Science, 1997.
- Polat N, Bostanci D, Yilmaz S (2001) Comparable age determination in different bony structures of Pleuronectes flesus luscus Pallas, 1811 inhabiting the Black Sea. Turk J Zool 25:441–446.
- Khan, MA and Khan, S. (2009). Comparison of age estimates from scale, opercular bone, otolith, vertebrae and dorsal fin ray in Labeo rohita (Hamilton), Catla catla (Hamilton) and Channa marulius (Hamilton).Fish Res 100:255–259.
- Thompson, D. W. 1910. The works of Aristotle translated into English under the editorship of J. A. Smith, M. A. Waynette Professor of Moral and Metaphysical Philosophy Fellow of Magdalen College and W. D. Ross, M. A. Fellow of Oriel College, Volume IV, Historia Animalium by D'Arcy Wentworth Thompson. Clarendon Press, Oxford. Available here
- Jackson J. 2007. Earliest references to age determination of fishes and their early application to the study of fisheries. Fisheries History. Fisheries. Vol 32:7.
- Tereschenko K., 1913. Voblya(Rutilusru tilus caspicu Jasck.)Its growth and prolificacy Works of the Astrakhan Ichthyological Laboratory 3(2):1-127. (Original not seen, information obtained from Jackson J. 2007).
- Holtzmayer, H. 1924. Zur Altersbestimmung der Acipenseriden. Zoologischer Anzeiger 59/60.16-18. (Original not seen, information summarized from Jackson 2007).
- Al-Absy, A.H. and K.D. Carlander. 1988. Criteria for selection of scale-sampling sites in growth studies of yellow perch. Transactions of the American Fisheries Society. 117:2, 209-212.
- Ricker, W. E. 1975. Computation and interpretation of biological statistics of fish populations. Fisheries Research Board of Canada Bulletin 191.
- Vandergoot, C S, Bur, MT and Powell, K A.(2008) Lake Erie Yellow Perch Age Estimation Based on Three Structures: Precision, Processing Times, and Management Implications, North American Journal of Fisheries Management, 28: 2, 563-571.
- Secor, D.H., Dean, J.M., and Laban, E.H. 1991. Otolith Removal and Preparation for Microstructural Examination: A User's Manual. Electric Power Research Institute and Belle W. Baruch Institute for Marine Biology and Coastal Research.
- Ma. B., Xie, C., Huo, B., Yang, X., and Li P. 2011. Age validation, and comparison of otolith, vertebra and opercular bone for estimating age of Schizothorax o' connori in the Yarlung Tsangp River, Tibet. Environ Biol Fish. 90:159-169.
- Borkholder, B.D., and A.J. Edwards. 2001. North American Journal of Fisheries Management 21:935-942.
- Jaurequizar, A.J. and Guerrero, R. 2009. Striped weakfish (Cynoscion guatucupa) population structure in waters adjacent to Rio de la Plata, environmental influence on its inter-annual variability. Estuarine, Coastal and Shelf Science. Vol 85. 89-96.
