= Sclerochronology =

Sclerochronology is the study of periodic physical and chemical features in the hard tissues of animals that grow by accretion, including invertebrates and coralline red algae, and the temporal context in which they formed. It is particularly useful in the study of marine paleoclimatology. The term was coined in 1974 following pioneering work on nuclear test atolls by Knutson and Buddemeier and comes from the three Greek words skleros (hard), chronos (time) and logos (science), which together refer to the use of the hard parts of living organisms to order events in time. It is, therefore, a form of stratigraphy. Sclerochronology focuses primarily upon growth patterns reflecting annual, monthly, fortnightly, tidal, daily, and sub-daily (ultradian) increments of time.

The regular time increments are controlled by biological clocks, which, in turn, are caused by environmental and astronomical pacemakers.

Familiar examples include:

- annual bandings in reef coral skeletons
- annual, fortnightly, daily and ultradian growth increments in mollusk shells
- annual bandings in the ear bones of fish, called otoliths.

Sclerochronology is analogous to dendrochronology, the study of annual rings in trees, and equally seeks to deduce organismal life history traits as well as to reconstruct records of environmental and climatic change through space and time.

== Use in paleoclimatic study ==
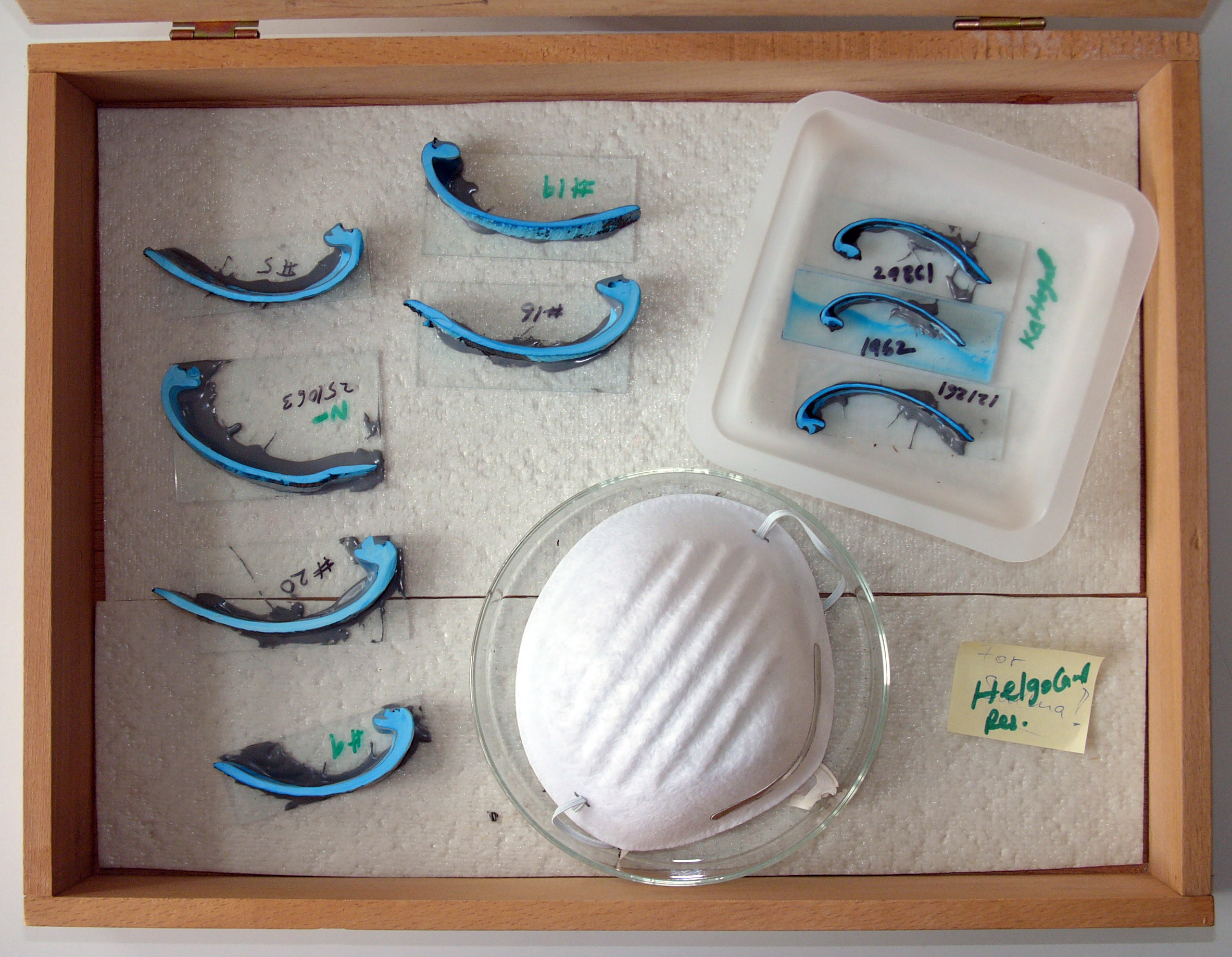
Arctica islandica from the North Sea, prepared for investigation of growth bands for palaeoclimate reconstructions (2009)

The science of sclerochronology as applied to hard parts of various organism groups is now routinely used for paleoceanographic and paleoclimate reconstructions. The study includes isotopic and elemental proxies, sometimes termed sclerochemistry.

Improvements in imaging techniques have now realised the potential to decipher coral banding at daily resolution, although biological 'vital' effects may blur the climate signal at such a high resolution.

== See also ==
- Paleoceanography
- Paleothermometer
