= Anna Traveset =

Spanish ecologist

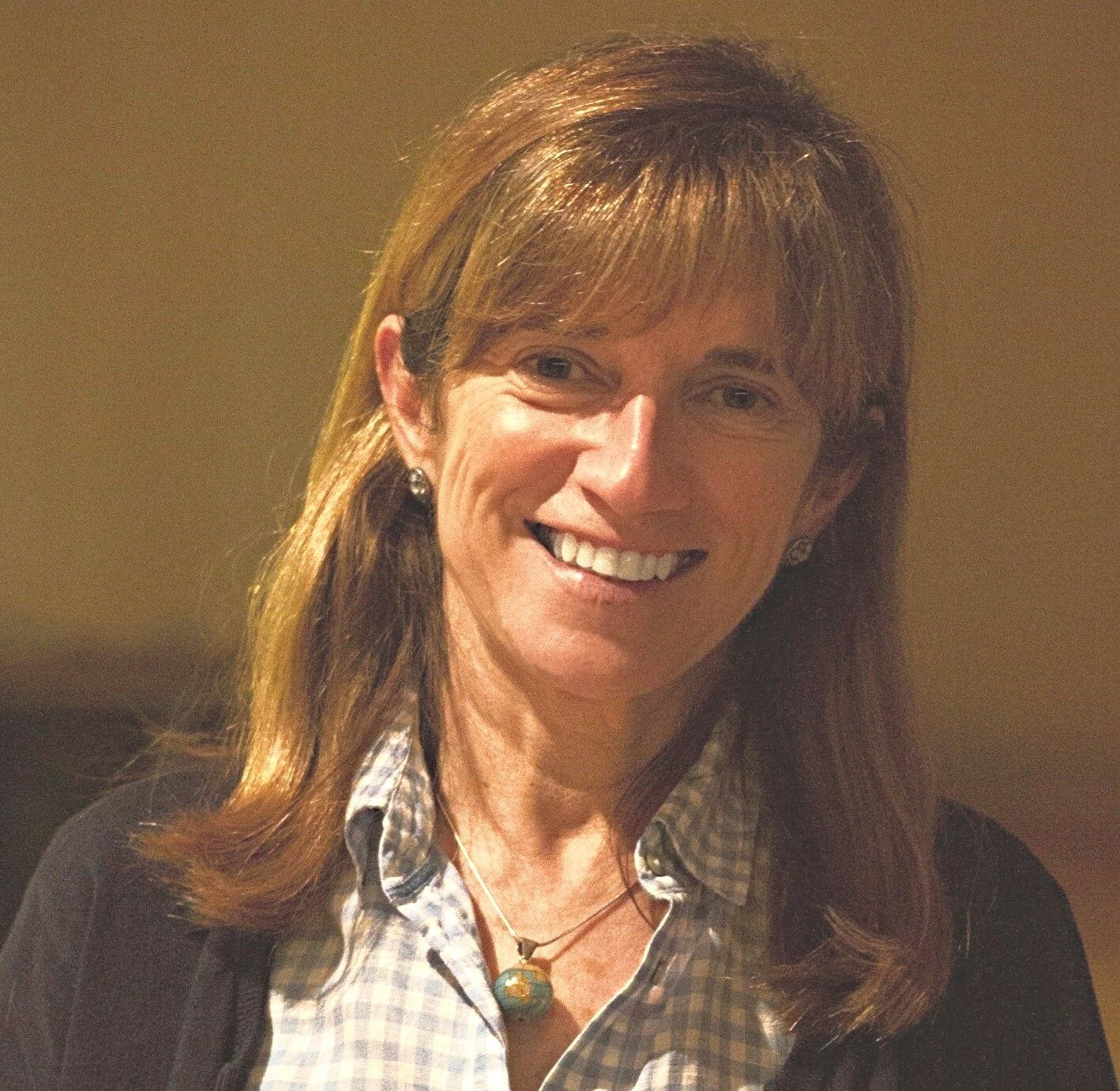
- Born: La Seu d'Urgell
- Occupations: Ecologist, Researcher
- Awards: Premi Rey Jaime I (2017) Premi Ramon Llull (2022) Distinción Luis Balaguer AEET(2023) Premio Margarita Salas CSIC (2023) Leandre Cervera SCB Award (2024)

Anna Traveset (La Seu d'Urgell) is a Spanish ecologist, particularly known for her work on ecological interactions between plants and animals, especially on islands.

Traveset is a Research Professor at the Mediterranean Institute for Advanced Studies – IMEDEA (CSIC-UIB) (Catalan: Institut Mediterrani d'Estudis Avançats; Spanish: Instituto Mediterráneo de Estudios Avanzados) based in Mallorca, and Collaborating Professor at the University of the Balearic Islands (Catalan: Universitat de les Illes Balears, UIB; Spanish: Universidad de las Islas Baleares). In 2017, she received the Rey Jaime I Award for Environmental Protection (Rey Jaime I Awards Foundation) and in 2022 the Ramon Llull Award by the Balearic Government. From 2019 to 2024, she held the position of Institutional Representative of the CSIC in the Balearic Islands.

== Education ==
Traveset received her Bachelor of Biology from the University of Barcelona (UB). She did her Master's thesis at UB, under the direction of Professor Ramón Margalef, on the taxonomy and ecology of freshwater sponges. She obtained her PhD at the University of Pennsylvania, Philadelphia (USA), where she began working on the subject of plant-animal interactions, doing fieldwork in Guanacaste National Park (Costa Rica). After returning to Spain, she did postdoctoral work at the Estación Biológica de Doñana (Doñana Biological Station) from 1990 to 1991, before moving to IMEDEA in Mallorca in 1992.

== Professional appointments ==
She began her professional career in the Spanish National Research Council (Spanish: Consejo Superior de Investigaciones Científicas, CSIC) in 1995 as an Associate Researcher. In 2001 she was promoted to the position of Scientific Researcher, a position she held until 2006, when she became a Research Professor at the Institution. She has led the laboratory of Terrestrial Ecology at IMEDEA since 2000. From 2002 to 2004 she was the Spanish representative of the LINKECOL (Linking Community and Ecosystem Ecology) Program of the European Science Foundation (ESF). From 2006 to 2014 she belonged to the International Committee for Science (IUBS). In the period 2010–2014 she was a member of the Panel "Evolutionary, Population and Environmental Biology" of the Advanced Research Grants of the European Research Council (ERC). In 2012–2013 she belonged to the Evaluation Committee of the Research Activity (CNEAI), and from 2014 to 2018 she was appointed National Research Panel officer, Biodiversity, Ecology and Global Change Program of the Spanish Ministry of Education and Science. Since 2017 she has belonged to the Committee of the Life Area of CSIC. In 2019 she entered the Advisory Committee of the NGO Initiative pour les Petites Îles de Méditerranée, and since 2018 she is a member of Alto Consejo Consultivo de I+D+I de la Generalidad Valencia.9

== Research ==
Her main line of research is the ecology and evolution of ecological interactions between plants and animals on islands, although many of her works are relevant also for the understanding of continental ecosystems. She also participates in mainland projects, both in Europe and America. Her research focuses mainly on the Balearic Islands, but she has also coordinated projects in other archipelagos such as the Canary Islands, Berlengas, Galapagos or Seychelles, oceanic islands that are important hotspots of biodiversity. Her most significant contributions have been in the field of pollination and seed dispersal, and she has also worked with plant-herbivore antagonistic interactions, with the ultimate interest of understanding how these interactions help maintain community biodiversity and ecosystem functioning. By using the network theory approach, her work has contributed to unveil the impact of global change -specifically biological invasions, habitat loss, and climate change- on native communities. She collaborates in various projects with researchers from different Spanish and foreign institutions and has published c. 300 papers and book chapters with researchers from more than 30 countries. Together with her colleague David Mark Richardson from Stellenbosch University (South Africa), she has edited the book Plant Invasions: The Role of Biotic Interactions, published by CABI in 2020.

== Recent and ongoing projects ==
- Determinants of island ecological complexity in the context of global change (IslandLife) ERC AdG 2022-2027.
- Acreditation “Unidad de Excelencia María de Maeztu” en el IMEDEA. Ministerio de Ciencia e Innovación (2023-2026). (CEX2021-001198-M) (P.I.: Anna Traveset)
- DEciPhering Island ecological ComplexiTy and its response to disturbances: field observations, theory and predictive models (DEPICT). Ministerio de Ciencia e Innovación. (2021-2024) (PID2020-114324GB-C21).
- Involving people to protect wild bees and other pollinators in the Mediterranean. European Union (LIFE18 GIE/IT/000755). LIFE 4 POLLINATORS
- Effects of global change on the trophic meta-networks in small islands. Ministry of Economy and Competitiveness (CGL2017-88122-P)
- Functional connectivity and green infrastructure. European Union (BIODIVERSA Program). FUNgreen
- Importance of simple and double plant-vertebrate mutualisms in islands: double benefits, double risks? Ministry of Economy and Competitiveness (CGL2013-44386-P)

== Honors and awards ==
- 2026. Member of the Academia Europaea, Section Ecology and Evolution.
- 2025. Premio Nacional Alejandro Malaspina en el Área de Ciencias y Tecnologías de los Recursos Naturales, awarded by the Ministry of Science, Innovation and Universities.
- 2024. Premi Leandre Cervera, awarded by the Catalan Society of Biology to the professional trajectory.
- 2023. Distinción Luis Balaguer, awarded by the Spanish Association of Terrestrial Ecology.
- 2023. Premio Medalla Margarita Salas del CSIC to the best trajectory of student supervisión.
- 2022. Premi Ramon Llull of the Balearic Government.
- 2022. European Research Council’s Advanced Grant.
- 2019-2024. Institutional Representative of the CSIC in the Balearic Islands.
- 2019-. Member of the Advisory Scientific Committee of Fundación Gadea.
- 2018-. Member of the High Consultative Council on R+D+i of the Generalitat Valencia.
- 2017. King James I Award (Spanish: Premio Rey Jaime I) for Environmental Conservation, awarded by the Generalitat de Valencia in its XXX edition. This is the most prestigious scientific award in Spain, with an international jury including 18 Nobel laureates.
- 1996. Bartomeu Darder Award. This is an award given by the Natural History Society of the Balearic Islands to the best study published in the area of natural sciences.

== Selected publications ==
- Martins, L.,... Traveset, A., ... & Tylianakis, J.M. (2022) Global and regional ecological boundaries drive abrupt changes in avian frugivory interactions. Nature Communications 13: 6943.
- Colom, P.; Ninyerola, M.; Pons, X.; Traveset, A. & Stefanescu S. (2022) Phenological sensitivity and seasonal variability explain climate-driven trends in Mediterranean butterflies. Proceedings of the Royal Soc. London Soc. B 289:20220251.
- Muñoz-Gallego, R.; Fedriani, J.M.; Serra, P. & Traveset, A. (2022) Non-additive effects of two contrasting introduced herbivores on the reproduction of a pollination-specialized palm. Ecology 103: e3797.
- Donoso, I., Fricke, E.C., Herv√≠as-Parejo, S., Rogers, H.S., and Traveset, A. (2022) Drivers of ecological and evolutionary disruptions in the seed dispersal process: global patterns and mechanisms. Frontiers in Ecol & Evol. 10, 794481.
- González-Varo J.P., Rumeu, JB., Albrecht, J., Arroyo, J.M., Bueno, R.S., Burgos, T., da Silva, L.P., Escribano-Ávila, G., Farwig, N., García, D., Heleno, R.H:, Illera, J.C., Jordano, P., Kurek, P., Simmons, B.I., Virgós, E., Sutherland, W.J., and Traveset, A. (2021) Bird-migration flows hinder plant dispersal towards cooler latitudes. Nature 595: 75-79.
- Rogers, H., Donoso, I., Traveset, A. and Fricke, E. (2021) Cascading Impacts of Seed Disperser Loss on Communities and Ecosystems. Annual Review of Ecology and Systematics 52: 641-666.
- Heleno, R.H., Ripple, W. J. & Traveset, A. (2020) Scientists' warning on endangered food webs. Web Ecology 20: 1–10.
- Traveset, A., Escribano-Avila, JM Gómez-Reyes & Valido, A. (2019) Conflicting selection on Cneorum tricoccon (Rutaceae) seed size caused by native and alien invasive seed dispersers. Evolution, 73: 2204–2215.
- Trojelsgaard, K., Heleno, R. & Traveset, A. (2019) Native and alien flower visitors differ in partner fidelity and network integration. Ecology Letters 22: 1264–1273.
- Traveset, A., Tur C. & Eguíluz, V.M. (2017) Plant survival and keystone pollinator species in stochastic coextinction models: role of intrinsic dependence on animal- pollination. Scientific Reports 7: 6915.
- González-Varo, J.P. & Traveset, A. (2016) The Labile Limits of Forbidden Interactions. Trends in Ecology & Evolution 31: 700–710.
- Tur, C., Sáez, A., Traveset, A. & Aizen, MA. (2016) Evaluating the effects of pollinator-mediated interactions using pollen transfer networks: evidence of widespread facilitation in south Andean plant communities. Ecology Letters 19: 576–586.
- Traveset, A. et al. (2015) Bird–flower visitation networks in the Galápagos unveil a widespread interaction release. Nature Communications 6: article 6376.
- Traveset, A. et al. (2015) Global patterns in pollination networks in island and continental areas. Global Ecology and Biogeography 25: 880–890.
- Valiente-Banuet, A.; MA Aizen, JM Alcántara, J Arroyo, A Cocucci, ..., A Traveset... (2014) Beyond species loss: the extinction of ecological interactions in a changing world. Functional Ecology 29: 299–307.
- Traveset, A. & Richardson, D.M. (2014) Mutualistic Interactions and Biological Invasions. Annual Review of Ecology, Evolution and Systematics 45: 89–113.
- Traveset, A. et al. (2013) Invaders of pollination networks in the Galápagos Islands: emergence of novel communities. Proceedings of the Royal Society B: Biological Sciences 280 (1758), 20123040.
- Morales, C.L. & Traveset, A. (2009) A meta-analysis of impacts of alien vs. native plants on pollinator visitation and reproductive success of co-flowering native plants. Ecology Letters 12: 716-728
- Traveset, A. & Richardson, D.M. (2006) Biological invasions as disruptors of plant reproductive mutualisms. Trends in Ecology & Evolution 21: 208–216.
- Willson, M. F., & Traveset, A. (2000). The ecology of seed dispersal. Seeds: the ecology of regeneration in plant communities, 2, 85–110.
- Traveset, A. (1998). Effect of seed passage through vertebrate frugivores' guts on germination: a review. Perspectives in Plant ecology, evolution and systematics, 1(2), 151–190.

The complete list of references can be found here: https://imedea.uib-csic.es/travesetlab/publications/
