= Otolith microchemical analysis =

Technique used in fisheries management and fisheries biology

Otolith microchemical analysis is a technique used in fisheries management and fisheries biology to delineate stocks and characterize movements, and natal origin of fish. The concentrations of elements and isotopes in otoliths are compared to those in the water in which the fish inhabits in order to identify where it has been. In non-ostariophysian fishes, the largest of the three otoliths, or ear bones, the sagitta is analyzed by one of several methods to determine the concentrations of various trace elements and stable isotopes. In ostariophysian fishes, the lapilli is the largest otolith and may be more commonly analysed.

== Relevance ==
Fisheries management requires intimate knowledge of fish life history traits. Migration patterns and spawning areas are key life history traits in the management of many species. If a fish is migrating between two regions that are managed separately then it will be managed as two separate stocks unless this migration can be understood. If this migration is not discovered then overfishing of the stock may occur because managers assume there is double the amount of fish. In the past costly and inefficient tag and recapture studies were needed to discover such migration patterns. Today otolith microchemistry provides a simpler way to assess migration patterns of fish. Otolith microchemistry has been used to identify and delineate Atlantic cod stocks in Canadian waters. It has also been used to determine the migratory patterns of anadromous whitefish.

Natal origin is equally critical to understand because areas where fish spawn and inhabit during their critical larval period must be identified and protected. Natal origin is also important in determining whether regions are sources or sinks for stocks of fish. In the past natal origin had to be assumed based upon collection on spawning grounds. In recent years otolith microchemistry has shown that this is not always the case. It has provided an accurate way to assess the natal origin of fish without collecting them on the spawning grounds. Otolith microchemistry has been used to accurately identify estuarine nursery areas of fish.

== Chemical Composition ==
The otoliths begin to form shortly after the fish hatches. Otoliths are composed of a crystalline calcium carbonate structure, in the form of aragonite, on a protein matrix. Calcium carbonate is diffused through the endolymph cell membrane and the aragonite layers are permanently deposited in discrete increments. These increments are permanently stored in layers and their composition is not altered over time. Along with calcium carbonate, other chemicals are deposited in trace amounts. The most common trace elements found in otoliths are the alkaline earth metals Strontium (Sr), Barium (Ba), and Magnesium (Mg) because they are in the alkaline earth metal group like Calcium and therefore have the same bonding affinity. This allows these alkaline earth metals to substitute in for calcium in the aragonite without affecting the crystalline structure. Other elements and stable isotopes can be deposited in lower concentrations within the aragonite structure and in the protein matrix. The uptake of chemicals into the otolith is multi-stage and complex, but the chemical composition of the discrete layers are proportional to that of the ambient water in which the fish is inhabiting at the time of deposition. These discrete layers create a temporal record of the water in which the fish has inhabited. There are 3 pairs of otoliths in bony fish, but only the largest, known as the saggita, is commonly used for microchemical analysis. The core of the otolith corresponds to the earliest larval period of the fish's life. Thus the microchemistry of the core of the otolith can be used as a means of inferring natal origin of fish.

== Analysis Methods ==
=== Water ===
A recent advance in approach to otolith microchemical analyses involves water chemistry analysis in conjunction with otolith microchemical analysis. In order to standardize chemical concentrations, all elemental concentrations are recorded as proportion to Ca. The difference between fresh and salt (marine) water is the simplest to differentiate. Salt water has much higher concentrations of dissolved chemicals than freshwater. Despite numerous differences in chemical composition the two environments can be easily distinguished with just two elemental concentrations; Ba and Sr. Ba occurs in higher concentrations in freshwater and lower concentrations in marine waters. Inversely, Sr occurs in higher concentrations in marine waters and lower concentrations in freshwater. This relationship is clearly evident in otolith chemistry.

While delineating fresh waters from marine is relatively straightforward, finer-scale resolution is required to examine spatial and temporal variation within biomes. In freshwater environments, examining Sr87/Sr86 isotope ratios is often employed to provide greater spatial resolution.

Inductively Coupled Plasma Optical Emission Spectroscopy (ICP-OES) and Inductively Coupled Plasma Atomic Emission Spectroscopy (ICP-AES) are two common techniques that work by directing superheated plasma at the water sample and analyzing the gasses given off for trace amounts of different chemicals. Another Common technique is a beam based approach known as Proton-Induced X-ray Emission. In this technique a beam of protons is directed at the sample and the subsequent x-ray emissions are analyzed to determine chemical makeup of the sample.

=== Otolith ===
Once chemical signatures of regions of water are identified, the otoliths can be analyzed for comparison. Otoliths are examined and analyzed in one of two basic ways. The entire otolith can be sampled, or a portion of the otolith can be isolated through a targeted assay. Both approaches begin with careful cleaning and preparation of the otoliths to be analyzed.

When data for fish movement over time or natal origin data is desired then a targeted portion approach is used. This approach is also known as a beam based approach because it uses a focused beam to analyze a small portion of the otolith at a time. All beam based techniques begin with cutting the otolith width wise through the core to reveal a cross section containing every layer from the origin outward. This section is placed in a polyester resin to hold it in position. A beam is then shot at the desired area and the chemical composition analyzed. For natal origin studies the core is analyzed. For temporal variation studies, a transect from the core through all the layers to the outer edge of the otolith is analyzed with the beam. Laser Ablation Inductively Coupled Mass Spectrometry (LA-ICPMS) is the most accurate and versatile. LA-ICPMS has been used for numerous natal origin and temporal variation studies. The technique uses an extremely fine beam laser to ablate, or burn away, a very shallow layer of the otolith. The emissions from this are then analyzed for chemical composition.

Stable isotope values of otoliths have also been used to determine climate in the past Fish otoliths as old as 172 million years have been used to study the environment in which the fish lived. Robotic micromilling devices have been used to recover very high resolution records of diet, life history and temperatures throughout the life of the fish, including their natal origin
