= Otolith =

Inner-ear structure in vertebrates which detects acceleration

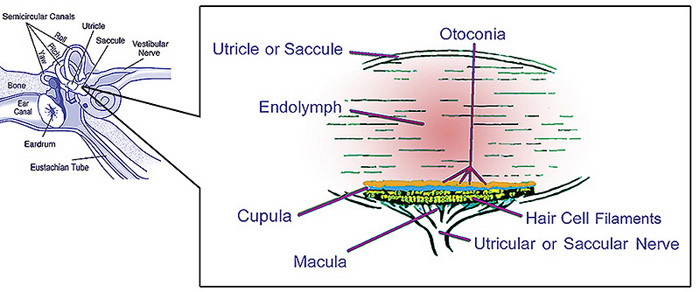
- Otolith organs showing detail of utricle, otoconia, endolymph, cupula, macula, hair cell filaments, and saccular nerve

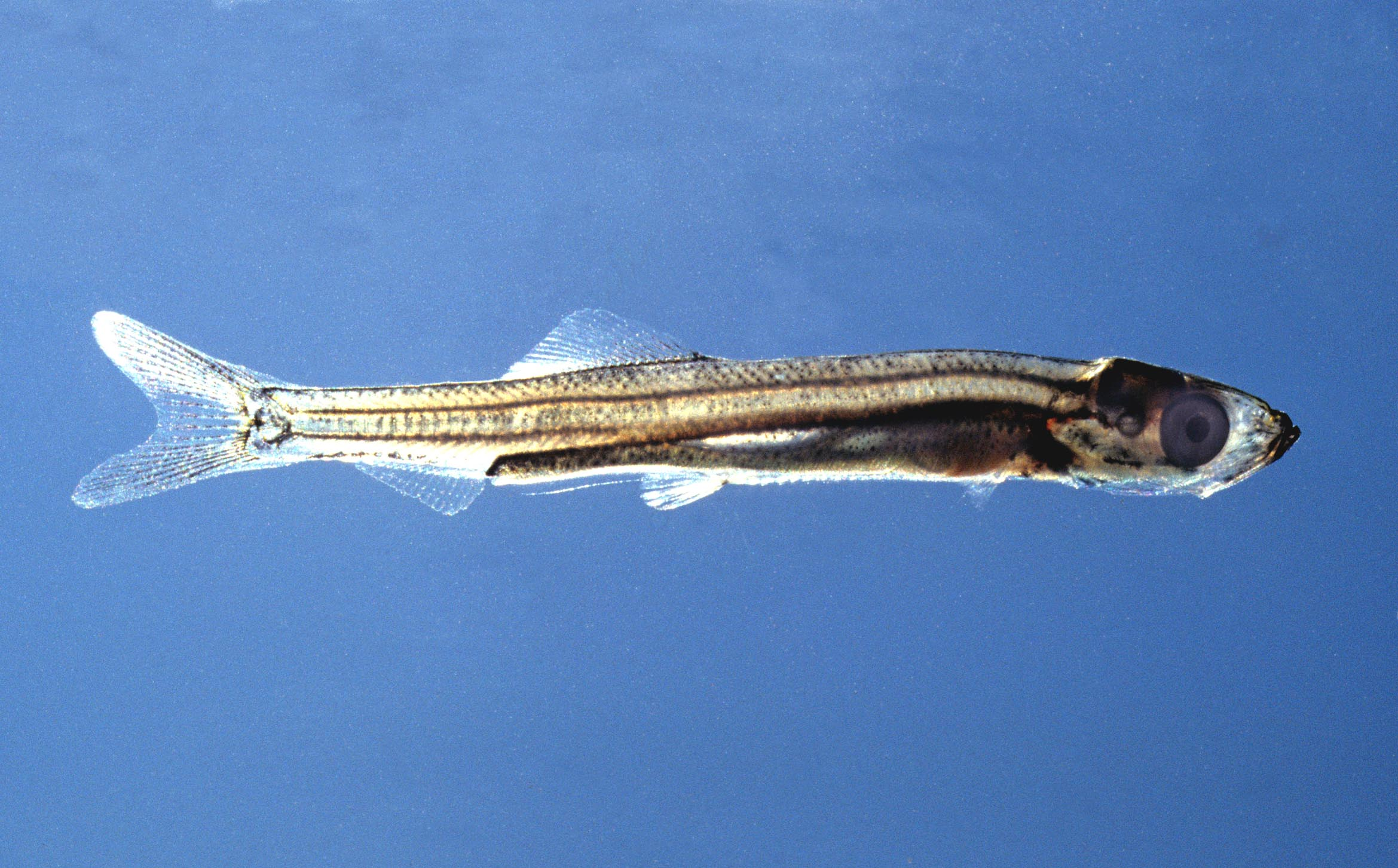
- Juvenile herring. Length 30 mm; 3 months old; still transparent; the otoliths are visible left of the eye.

Details

Identifiers
- Latin: statoconium
- TA98: A15.3.03.086
- FMA: 77826

An otolith (Ancient Greek: ὠτο-, ōto- ear + λῐ́θος, líthos, a stone), also called otoconium, statolith, or statoconium, is a calcium carbonate structure in the saccule or utricle of the inner ear, specifically in the vestibular system of vertebrates. The saccule and utricle, in turn, together make the otolith organs. These organs are what allows an organism, including humans, to perceive linear acceleration, both horizontally and vertically (gravity). They have been identified in both extinct and extant vertebrates.

Counting the annual growth rings on the otoliths is a common technique in estimating the age of fish.

== Description ==
Endolymphatic infillings such as otoliths are structures in the saccule and utricle of the inner ear, specifically in the vestibular labyrinth of all vertebrates (fish, amphibians, reptiles, mammals and birds). In vertebrates, the saccule and utricle together make the otolith organs. Both statoconia and otoliths are used as gravity, balance, movement, and directional indicators in all vertebrates and have a secondary function in sound detection in higher aquatic and terrestrial vertebrates. They are sensitive to gravity and linear acceleration. Because of their orientation in the head, the utricle is sensitive to a change in horizontal movement, and the saccule gives information about vertical acceleration (such as when in an elevator).

Similar balance receptors called statocysts can be found in many invertebrate groups but are not contained in the structure of an inner ear. Mollusk statocysts are of a similar morphology to the displacement-sensitive organs of vertebrates; however, the function of the mollusk statocyst is restricted to gravity detection and possibly some detection of angular momentum. These are analogous structures, with similar form and function but not descended from a common structure.

Statoconia (also called otoconia) are numerous grains, often spherical in shape, between 1 and 50 μm; collectively. Statoconia are also sometimes termed a statocyst. Otoliths (also called statoliths) are agglutinated crystals or crystals precipitated around a nucleus, with well defined morphology and together all may be termed endolymphatic infillings.

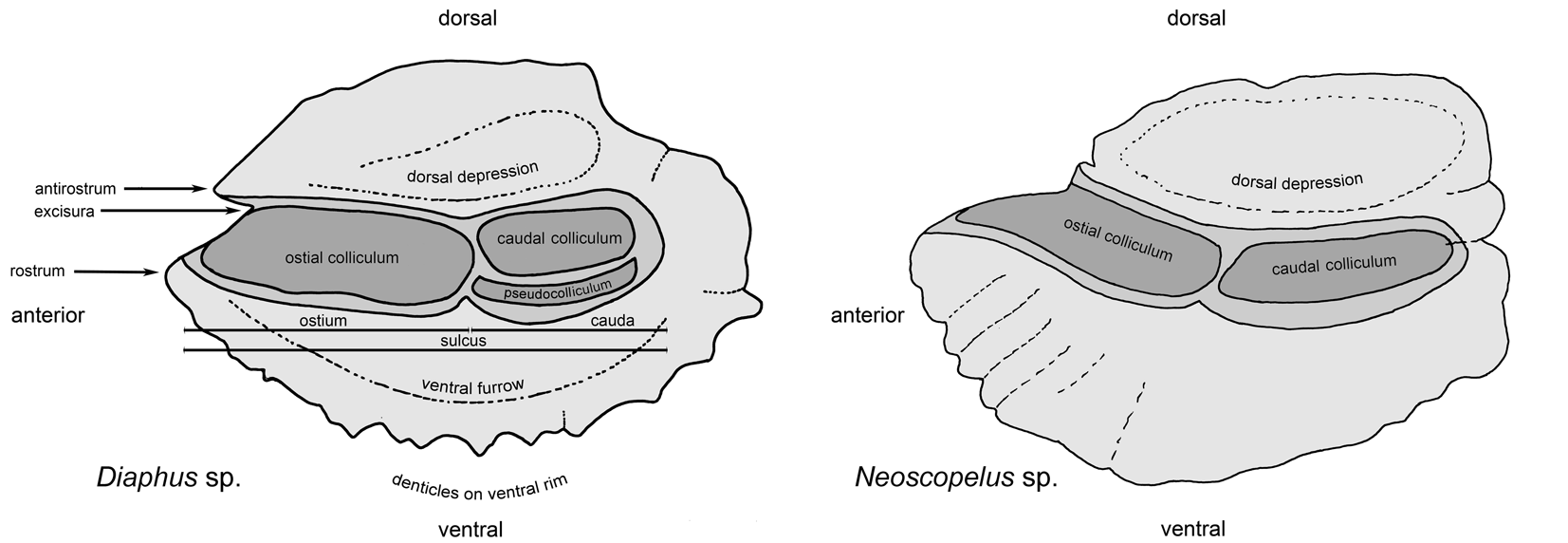
Morphology and terminology of lanternfish (Diaphus, left side) and neoscopelid otoliths (Neoscopelus, right side)

== Mechanism ==
The semicircular canals and sacs in all vertebrates are attached to endolymphatic ducts, which in some groups (such as sharks) end in small openings, called endolymphatic pores, on the dorsal surface of the head. Extrinsic grains may enter through these openings, typically less than a millimeter in diameter. The size of material that enters is limited to sand-sized particles and in the case of sharks is bound together with an endogenous organic matrix that the animal secretes.

In mammals, otoliths are small particles, consisting of a combination of a gelatinous matrix and calcium carbonate in the viscous fluid of the saccule and utricle. The weight and inertia of these small particles causes them to stimulate hair cells when the head moves. The hair cells are made up of 40 to 70 stereocilia and one kinocilium, which is connected to an afferent nerve. Hair cells send signals down sensory nerve fibers which are interpreted by the brain as motion. In addition to sensing acceleration of the head, the otoliths can help to sense the orientation via gravity's effect on them. When the head is in a normal upright position, the otolith presses on the sensory hair cell receptors. This pushes the hair cell processes down and prevents them from moving side to side. However, when the head is tilted, the pull of gravity on otoliths shifts the hair cell processes to the side, distorting them and sending a message to the central nervous system that the head is tilted.

There is evidence that the vestibular system of mammals has retained some of its ancestral acoustic sensitivity and that this sensitivity is mediated by the otolithic organs (most likely the sacculus, due to its anatomical location). In mice lacking the otoconia of the utricle and saccule, this retained acoustic sensitivity is lost. In humans vestibular evoked myogenic potentials occur in response to loud, low-frequency acoustic stimulation in patients with the sensorineural hearing loss. Vestibular sensitivity to ultrasonic sounds has also been hypothesized to be involved in the perception of speech presented at artificially high frequencies, above the range of the human cochlea (~18 kHz). In mice, sensation of acoustic information via the vestibular system has been demonstrated to have a behaviourally relevant effect; response to an elicited acoustic startle reflex is larger in the presence of loud, low frequency sounds that are below the threshold for the mouse cochlea (~4 Hz), raising the possibility that the acoustic sensitivity of the vestibular system may extend the hearing range of small mammals.

== Comparative physiology ==
In most vertebrates, otoliths are made of calcium carbonate, however in lampreys and hagfish, they are made of calcium phosphate. The polymorphs of calcium carbonate vary between different gnathostome groups. In Chondrichthyes it is of aragonite. In Chondrostei it is of vaterite (a rather unstable morph). In Holostei it is of a vaterite-aragonite mixture. In Teleostei, Coelacanthii, Dipnoi, and Amphibia, it is of aragonite. In most other tetrapods, it is of calcite, the most stable morph of calcium carbonate. In reptiles, it is of a mixture of calcite and aragonite.

== Paleontology ==
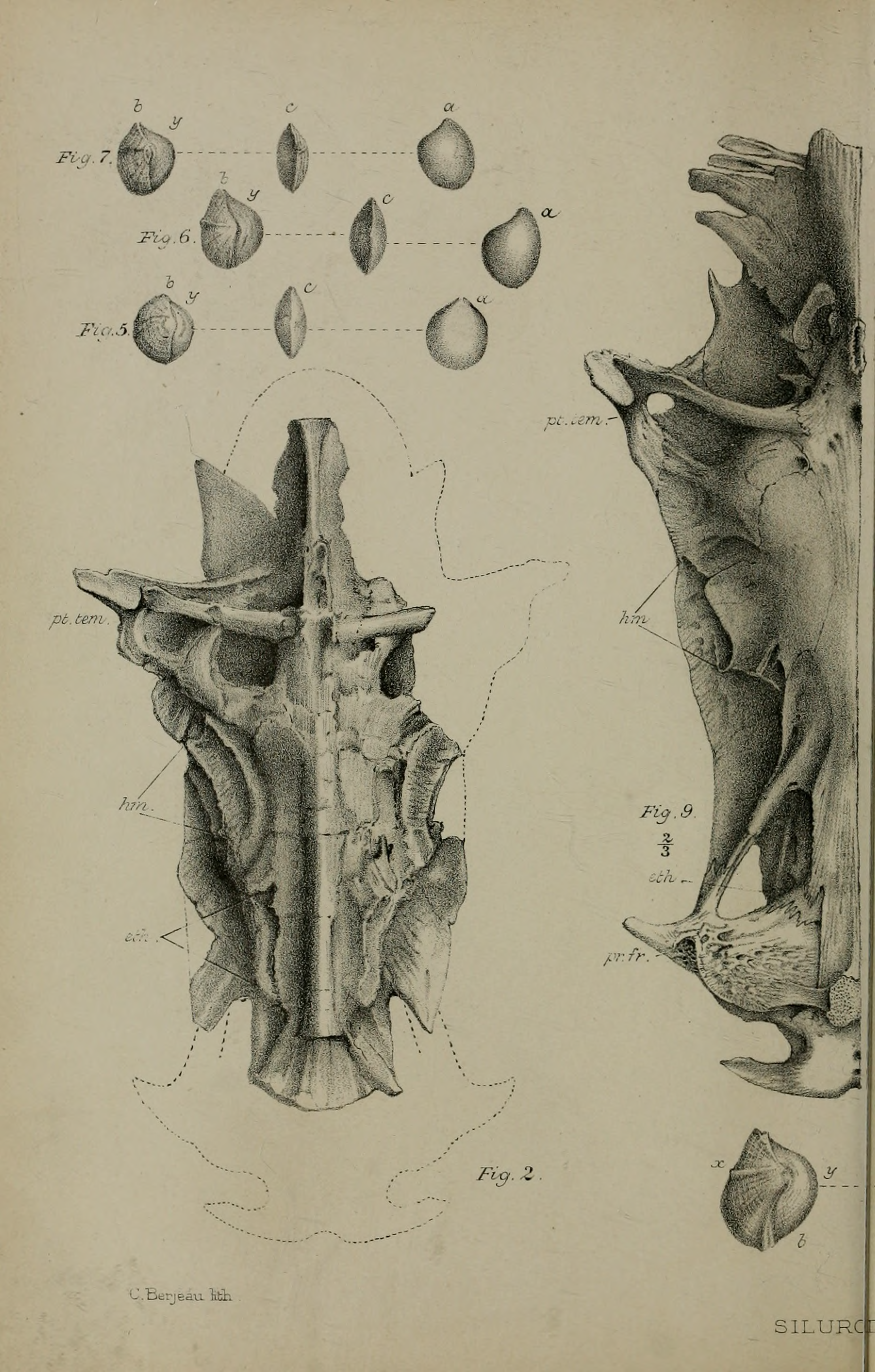
Fossil sea catfish otoliths (top left) from the Late Eocene of England, along with a fossil catfish skull from the same locality (bottom left)

After the death and decomposition of a fish, otoliths may be preserved within the body of an organism or be dispersed before burial and fossilization. Dispersed otoliths are one of the many microfossils which can be found through a micropalaeontological analysis of a fine sediment. Their stratigraphic significance is minimal, but can still be used to characterize a level or interval. Fossil otoliths are rarely found in situ (on the remains of the animal), likely because they are not recognized separately from the surrounding rock matrix. In some cases, due to differences in colour, grain size, or a distinctive shape, they can be identified. These rare cases are of special significance, since the presence, composition, and morphology of the material can clarify the relationship of species and groups. In the case of primitive fish, various fossil material shows that endolymphatic infillings were similar in elemental composition to the rock matrix but were restricted to coarse grained material, which presumably is better for the detection of gravity, displacement, and sound. The presence of these extrinsic grains in osteostracans, chondrichthyans, and acanthodians indicates a common inner ear physiology and presence of open endolymphatic ducts.

Otoliths serve an important role in bony fish paleontology, as their morphology tends to be diagnostic to a specific fish species, and they tend to preserve in much larger quantities than skeletal remains, allowing for an accurate estimate of a locality's fossil ichthyofauna even in the absence of diagnostic skeletal remains. Nearly two thousand fossil fish species have been described on just the basis of isolated otoliths. However, the reliability of otolith-based species descriptions for taxa prior to the Neogene has been disputed by other authors, as otoliths themselves do not directly convey the identity of the fish they came from, and taxonomic assignments tend to be based on morphological comparisons with the otoliths of extant fishes, without accounting for convergent evolution of otolith morphologies. For example, otolith-based stratigraphy indicates that a majority of modern fish genera have been present since the Eocene, but exclusively skeletal data from the same time period does not support this conclusion, as the vast majority of such remains are of extinct genera. The only foolproof way to properly assign a fossil otolith to a specific fish taxon is when a diagnostic fish skeleton is preserved with otoliths, but such cases tend to be rare due to requiring exquisite preservation of both skeleton & otolith together. It has also been suggested that fossil otoliths from the Miocene (or potentially Oligocene) onwards can be taxonomically assigned with a high degree of confidence as a majority of extant fish genera would have evolved by this time, but that accuracy declines when analyzing otoliths from the earlier Paleogene and Cretaceous.

Otolith-based fossil species that can be assigned to a specific taxonomic grouping, but not a specific genus, are sometimes left in open nomenclature with a provisional genus name, as "genus (family name)-arum" specific epithet (i.e. "genus Gadidarum" ensiformis for an indeterminate gadid otolith). However, this naming scheme is not allowed by the International Code for Zoological Nomenclature, and they are now generally placed in properly-described genera.

An unclassified fossil named Gluteus minimus has been thought to be possible otoliths, but it is hitherto unknown to which animal they could belong to.

== Ecology ==
=== Composition ===
Animation of the biomineralization of cod otoliths

The composition of fish otoliths is also proving useful to fisheries scientists. The calcium carbonate that the otolith is composed of is primarily derived from the water. As the otolith grows, new calcium carbonate crystals form. As with any crystal structure, lattice vacancies will exist during crystal formation allowing trace elements from the water to bind with the otolith. Studying the trace elemental composition or isotopic signatures of trace elements within a fish otolith gives insight to the water bodies fish have previously occupied. Fish otoliths as old as 172 million years have been used to study the environment in which the fish lived. Robotic micromilling devices have also been used to recover very high resolution records of life history, including diet and temperatures throughout the life of the fish, as well as their natal origin.

The most studied trace and isotopic signatures are strontium due to the same charge and similar ionic radius to calcium; however, scientists can study multiple trace elements within an otolith to discriminate more specific signatures. A common tool used to measure trace elements in an otolith is a laser ablation inductively coupled plasma mass spectrometer. This tool can measure a variety of trace elements simultaneously. A secondary ion mass spectrometer can also be used. This instrument can allow for greater chemical resolution but can only measure one trace element at a time. The hope of this research is to provide scientists with valuable information on where fish have frequented. Combined with otolith annuli, scientists can add how old fish were when they traveled through different bodies of water. This information can be used to determine fish life cycles so that fisheries scientists can make better informed decisions about fish stocks.

=== Growth rate and age ===
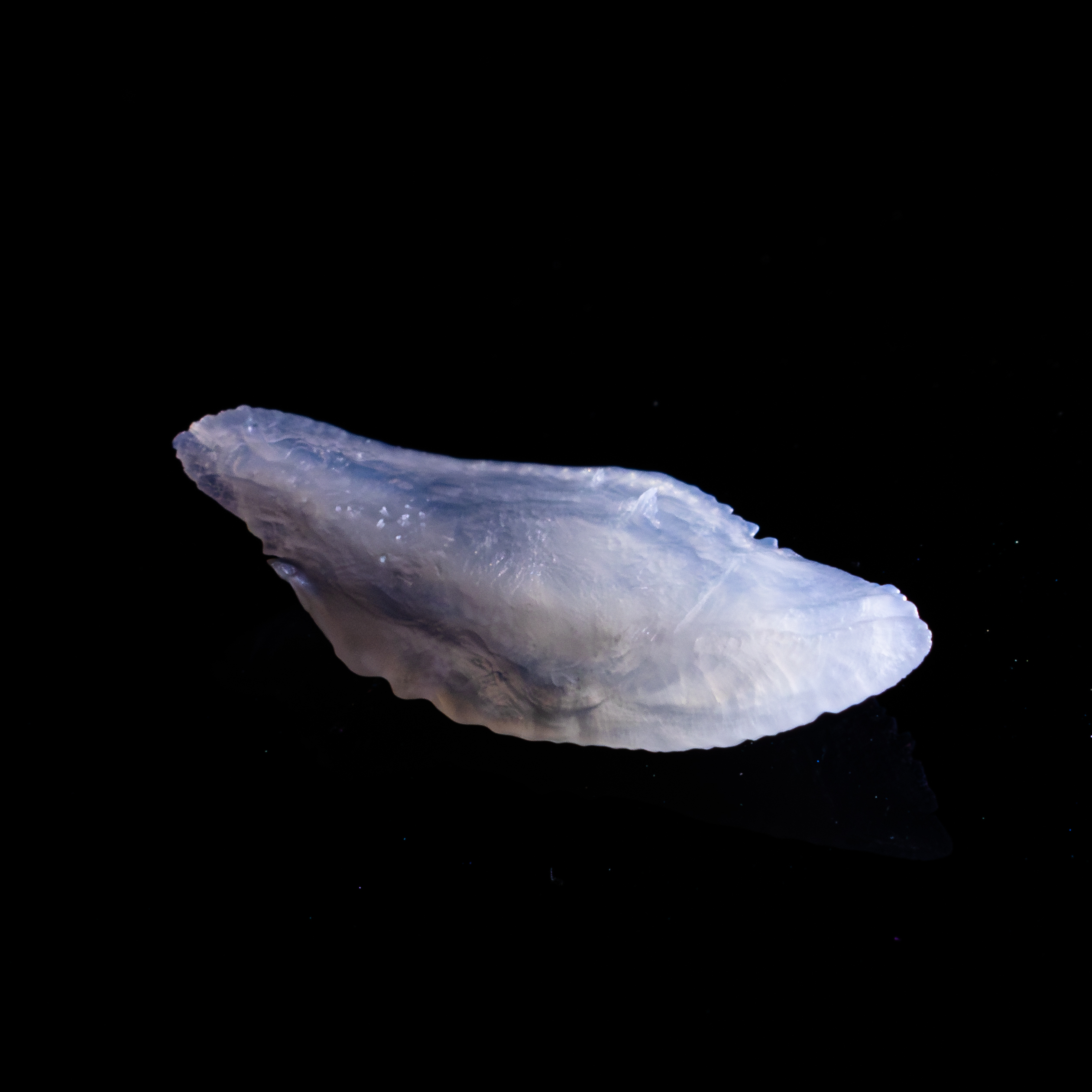
Photo of an otolith from an adult European sea bass, caught in the Mediterranean Sea

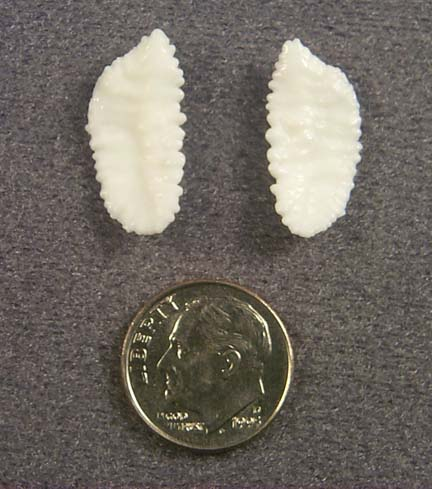
A pair of sagittae from a Pacific Cod (Gadus macrocephalus)

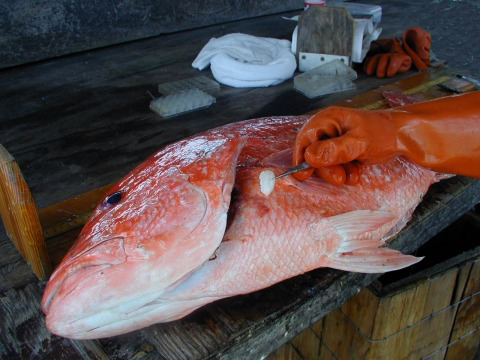
Removing an otolith from a red snapper to determine its age

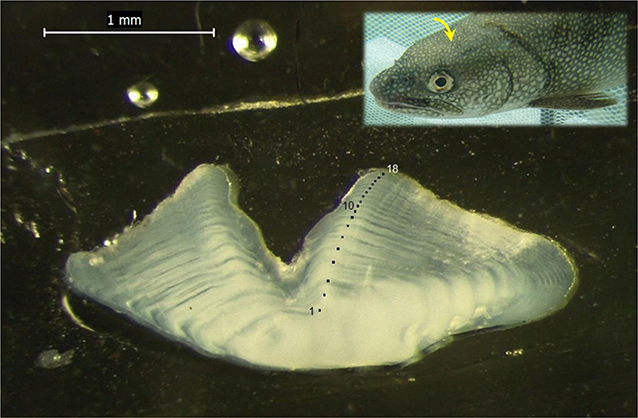
Cross-section of an otolith from an 18-year-old lake trout. The black dots mark the edges of its rings. Rings for years 1, 10, and 18 are labeled. The yellow arrow shows its approximate location in a lake trout.

Finfish (class Osteichthyes) have three pairs of otoliths – the sagittae (singular sagitta), lapilli (singular lapillus), and asterisci (singular asteriscus). The sagittae are largest, found just behind the eyes and approximately level with them vertically. The lapilli and asterisci (smallest of the three) are located within the semicircular canals. The sagittae are normally composed of aragonite (although vaterite abnormalities can occur), as are the lapilli, while the asterisci are normally composed of vaterite.

The shapes and proportional sizes of the otoliths vary with fish species. In general, fish from highly structured habitats such as reefs or rocky bottoms (e.g. snappers, groupers, many drums and croakers) will have larger otoliths than fish that spend most of their time swimming at high speed in straight lines in the open ocean (e.g. tuna, mackerel, dolphinfish). Flying fish have unusually large otoliths, possibly due to their need for balance when launching themselves out of the water to "fly" in the air. Often, the fish species can be identified from distinct morphological characteristics of an isolated otolith.

Fish otoliths accrete layers of calcium carbonate and gelatinous matrix throughout their lives. The accretion rate varies with growth of the fish – often less growth in winter and more in summer – which results in the appearance of rings that resemble tree rings. By counting the rings, it is possible to determine the age of the fish in years. Typically the sagitta is used, as it is largest, but sometimes lapilli are used if they have a more convenient shape. The asteriscus, which is smallest of the three, is rarely used in age and growth studies.

In addition, in most species the accretion of calcium carbonate and gelatinous matrix alternates on a daily cycle. It is therefore also possible to determine fish age in days. This latter information is often obtained under a microscope, and provides significant data to early life history studies.

By measuring the thickness of individual rings, it has been assumed (at least in some species) to estimate fish growth because fish growth is directly proportional to otolith growth. However, some studies disprove a direct link between body growth and otolith growth. At times of lower or zero body growth the otolith continues to accrete leading some researchers to believe the direct link is to metabolism, not growth per se. Otoliths, unlike scales, do not reabsorb during times of decreased energy making it even more useful tool to age a fish. Fish never stop growing entirely, though growth rate in mature fish is reduced. Rings corresponding to later parts of the life cycle tend to be closer together as a result. Furthermore, a small percentage of otoliths in some species bear deformities over time.

Age and growth studies of fish are important for understanding such things as timing and magnitude of spawning, recruitment and habitat use, larval and juvenile duration, and population age structure. Such knowledge is in turn important for designing appropriate fisheries management policies.

=== Diet research ===
Since otoliths are resistant to digestion, they are found in the digestive tracts and scats of fish-eating species. Otoliths have been found in the digestive systems of seabirds, dolphins, seals, sea lions and walruses. Many otoliths can be identified as belonging to particular genus and species. Otoliths can therefore, to some extent, be used to deduce and reconstruct the prey composition of marine mammal and seabird diets.

Otoliths are bilaterally symmetrical, with each fish having one right and one left. Separating recovered otoliths into right and left, therefore, allows one to infer a minimum number of prey individuals ingested for a given fish species. Otolith size is also proportional to the length and weight of a fish. They can therefore be used to back-calculate prey size and biomass, useful when trying to estimate marine mammal prey consumption, and potential impacts on fish stocks.

Otoliths cannot be used alone to reliably estimate cetacean or pinniped diets, however. They may suffer partial or complete erosion in the digestive tract, skewing measurements of prey number and biomass. Species with fragile, easily digested otoliths may be underestimated in the diet. To address these biases, otolith correction factors have been developed through captive feeding experiments, in which seals are fed fish of known size, and the degree of otolith erosion is quantified for different prey taxa.

The inclusion of fish vertebrae, jaw bones, teeth, and other informative skeletal elements improves prey identification and quantification over otolith analysis alone. This is especially true for fish species with fragile otoliths, but other distinctive bones, such as Atlantic mackerel (Scomber scombrus), and Atlantic herring (Clupea harengus).

== Otolith ornaments ==
'Sea gems' ornaments from fish otoliths have been introduced in the market in India recently by a group of fisher women in Vizhinjam, trained by the Central Marine Fisheries Research Institute (CMFRI).

== See also ==
- Ossicles
- Otolithic membrane
- Otolith microchemical analysis
- Orbiting Frog Otolith, 1970 space mission
