= Boettcher =

Bottcher or Böttcher is a German surname. Notable people with the surname include:

- Albrecht Böttcher (born 1954), German mathematician
- Annabelle Boettcher (born 1961), German political scientist
- Arthur Böttcher (1831–1889), German pathologist and anatomist
- August Friedrich Böttcher (1825–1900), insect dealer in Berlin
- Bas Böttcher (born 1974), German slam poet
- Brendan Bottcher (born 1991), Canadian curler
- Bryce Boettcher (born 2002), American football and baseball player
- Champ Boettcher (1900–1965), American football player
- Charles Boettcher (1852–1948), German-born Colorado businessman and philanthropist
- Curt Boettcher (1944–1987), American singer, songwriter, musician and record producer
- Grit Boettcher (born 1938), German actress
- Günter Böttcher (1954–2012), West German handball player
- Herman Bottcher (1909–1944), American soldier born in Germany
- Hermann Böttcher (1866–1935), German stage and film actor
- Julia Böttcher, German mathematician
- Jürgen Böttcher (born 1931), German film director and painter
- Karl Böttcher (1886–1974), German general
- Lucjan Böttcher (1872–1937), Polish mathematician
- Markus Böttcher (born 1964), German television actor
- Martin Böttcher (1927–2019), German composer and conductor
- Maximilian Böttcher (1872–1950), German writer
- Mike Boettcher (born 1954), American journalist and war correspondent
- Paul Böttcher (1912–1998), highly decorated lieutenant in the Wehrmacht during World War I
- Wolfgang Boettcher (1935–2021), German classical cellist

== See also ==
- Boetcher
- Böttcher America, subsidiary of the German firm Felix Böttcher GmbH
- Boettcher Memorial Tropical Conservatory
- Boettcher cell
- Böttcher's equation and function
- Helena Boettcher, athlete
- Boettcher Concert Hall
- Boettcher Scholarship
