= Otolin =

OTOL1

Identifiers
- Aliases: OTOL1, C1QTNF15, otolin 1, C1QTNF16
- External IDs: MGI: 2685260; GeneCards: OTOL1

Gene location (Human)
Chr.	Chromosome 3 (human)
Band	3q26.1	Start	161,496,808 bp
Band	3q26.1	End	161,503,942 bp

Gene location (Mouse)
Chr.	Chromosome 3 (mouse)
Band	3|3 E2	Start	69,914,946 bp
Band	3|3 E2	End	69,936,041 bp
RNA expression pattern
Bgee	Human / Mouse (ortholog); Top expressed in: prefrontal cortex; Brodmann area 9; temporal lobe; amygdala; hippocampus proper / Top expressed in: placenta; rhombencephalon; More reference expression data
BioGPS	n/a
Gene ontology
Molecular function	calcium ion binding; metal ion binding; extracellular matrix structural constituent
Cellular component	collagen; extracellular region; extracellular space; extracellular matrix
Biological process	otolith mineralization; protein homooligomerization; extracellular matrix organization
Sources:Amigo / QuickGO
Orthologs
Databases	NCBI: entry; OMA: entry
Species	Human	Mouse
Entrez	131149	229389
Ensembl	ENSG00000182447	ENSMUSG00000027788
UniProt	A6NHN0	Q4ZJM7
RefSeq (mRNA)	NM_001080440	NM_001018031
RefSeq (protein)	NP_001073909	NP_001018041
Location (UCSC)	Chr 3: 161.5 – 161.5 Mb	Chr 3: 69.91 – 69.94 Mb
PubMed search
- Wikidata
View/Edit Human	View/Edit Mouse

Otolin is a glycoprotein found in the vertebrate inner ear.

== Modifications ==
Otolin is modified after it is translated, with hydroxylated prolines and two glycosylated lysines with glucosyl-galactosyl groups.

== Substructure ==
The gene for otolin in mice is on chromosome 3E12. In humans it is located at 3q26.1 At the N-terminal end there is a signal peptide. The N-terminal end has four cysteine residues. Adjacent to this is a stiff collagen domain with 75 Gly-X-Y repeats. It also contains a cysteine residue, and in human otolin, there are four cystein residues in this domain. At the opposite end is the C1q domain. The otolin gene in mammals contains four introns and five exons.

== Superstructure ==
Otolin combines with several other otolin molecules to form an oligomer, probably a trimer. It also binds to otoconin-90 and cerebellin-1.

== Production ==
Otolin is produced by the vestibular support cells in the utricle, saccule, the three semicircular canal cristae, and the tectorial membrane. In teleosts (fish), otolin is found in the otolith and it is required to anchor the otolith in position.
