= Drop attack =

Sudden fall without loss of consciousness

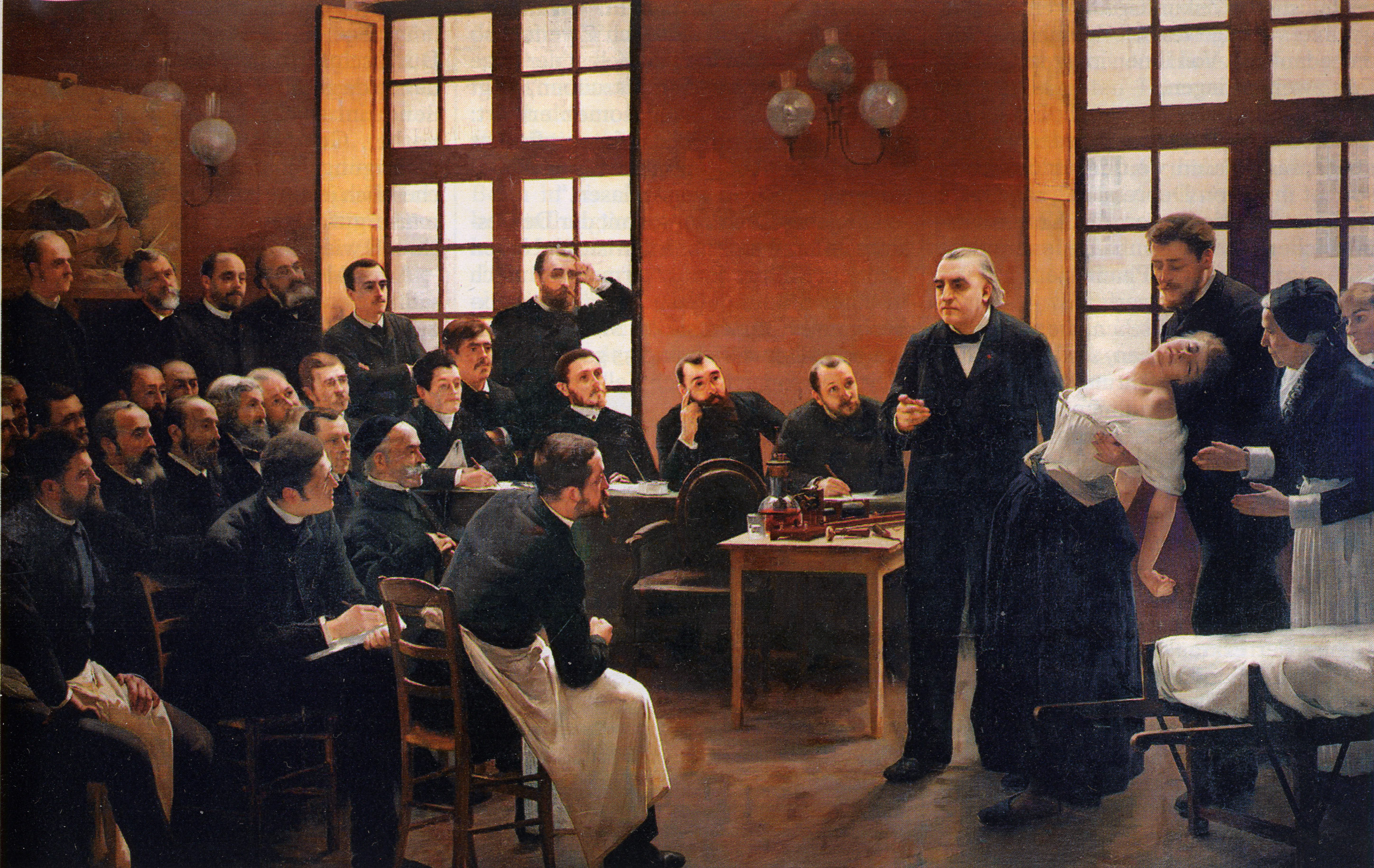
Depiction of a drop attack.

A drop attack is a sudden fall without loss of consciousness. A drop attack has been defined as "a collapse or fall with little warning, following which the patient lies motionless or nearly motionless for a variable time, but often with rapid recovery to their normal state". However, the understanding of what constitutes a drop attack varies widely between authors.

Drop attacks stem from diverse mechanisms, including orthopedic causes (for example, leg weakness and knee instability), hemodynamic causes (for example, transient vertebrobasilar insufficiency, a type of interruption of blood flow to the brain), and neurologic causes (such as epileptic seizures or unstable vestibular function).

The term "drop attack", also known as "cryptogenic drop attack" or "La maladie des genoux bleus"; is used to categorize otherwise unexplained falls from a wide variety of causes and is considered ambiguous medical terminology; drop attacks are currently reported much less often than in the past, possibly as a result of better diagnostic precision.

The common cardiovascular causes of drop attacks include syncope (a sudden transient loss of awareness due to reduced blood flow to the brain), orthostatic hypotension (which is often precipitated by medications), and arrhythmias (abnormalities of the heart beat). A drop of systolic blood pressure more than 20 mm Hg or a drop in diastolic blood pressure more than 10 mm Hg can indicate orthostatic hypotension. Syncope following exertion may indicate structural heart defects like hypertrophic cardiomyopathy or cardiac tumours. While the majority of syncopal events are benign in nature, a drop attack could be a harbinger of a potentially lethal cardiac disorder like Brugada syndrome or long QT syndrome. By definition, drop attacks exclude syncopal falls (fainting), which involve short loss of consciousness. Hence, a detailed cardiac evaluation, including echocardiography and Holter study (a continuous ECG monitoring) is recommended in drop attacks due to syncope.

In neurology, the term "drop attack" is used to describe certain types of seizure which occur in epilepsy. Epileptic drop attacks are atonic seizures that can cause sudden, often injurious falls. These are commonly seen in severe childhood epilepsies like Lennox–Gastaut syndrome and Doose Syndrome as well as symptomatic focal epilepsies. These are often difficult to treat and may need a combination of antiseizure medications and/or non-pharmacological measures like vagal nerve stimulation (VNS) or corpus callosotomy (transsection of the midline brain fibres).

Drop attacks that have a vestibular origin within the inner ear may be experienced by some people in the later stages of Ménière's disease (these may be referred to as Tumarkin drop attacks, or as Tumarkin's otolithic crisis). These have been attributed to dysfunction of the utricle and saccule.

Drop attacks often occur in elderly people; with a majority of documented cases occurring in women. Cardiac disorders are the most common cause of drop attacks in the elderly followed by disorders of gait and balance. Falls in older adults happen for many reasons, and the goals of health care include preventing any preventable falls and correctly diagnosing any falls that do happen.
