= Saccular nerve =

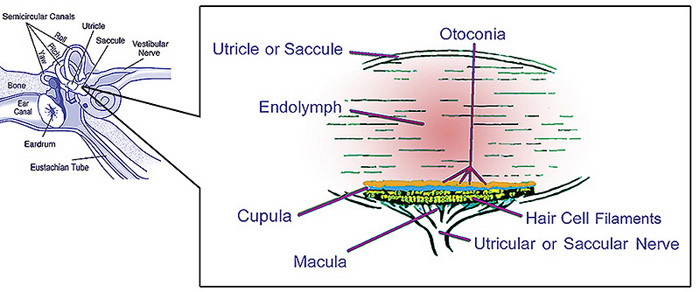
- illustration of otolith organs showing detail of utricle, ococonia, endolymph, cupula, macula, hair cell filaments, and saccular nerve

Details
- From: Vestibular nerve

Identifiers
- Latin: nervus saccularis
- TA98: A14.2.01.132
- TA2: 6317
- FMA: 53467

The saccular nerve is a nerve which supplies the macula of the saccule.
