= Inner ear regeneration =

Biological process

Inner ear regeneration is the biological process by which the hair cells and supporting cells (i.e. Hensen's cells and Deiters cells) of the ear proliferate (cell proliferation) and regrow after hair cell injury. This process depends on communication between supporting cells and the brain. Because of the volatility of the inner ear's hair cells, regeneration is crucial to the functioning of the inner ear. It is also a limited process, which contributes to the irreversibility of hearing loss in humans and other mammals.

== Anatomy ==
=== Hair cells ===
Hair cells and supporting cells are both located in the cochlea inside the inner ear. In mammals, hair cells are located in the Organ of Corti and convert energy from sound waves and physical movement into electrical signals. This is accomplished through integrating neurons with hair cells that transmit signals to the auditory nerve. There are three rows of outer hair cells and one row of inner hair cells on the Organ of Corti. 95% of neurons that transmit signals to the auditory nerve are connected to inner hair cells, making inner hair cells mainly responsible for auditory sensory input. While inner hair cells are the sensory receptors, outer hair cells are the efferent receptors and are important in fine-tuning sensory input by contracting and relaxing to alter the tectorial membrane on the surface of the hair cells.

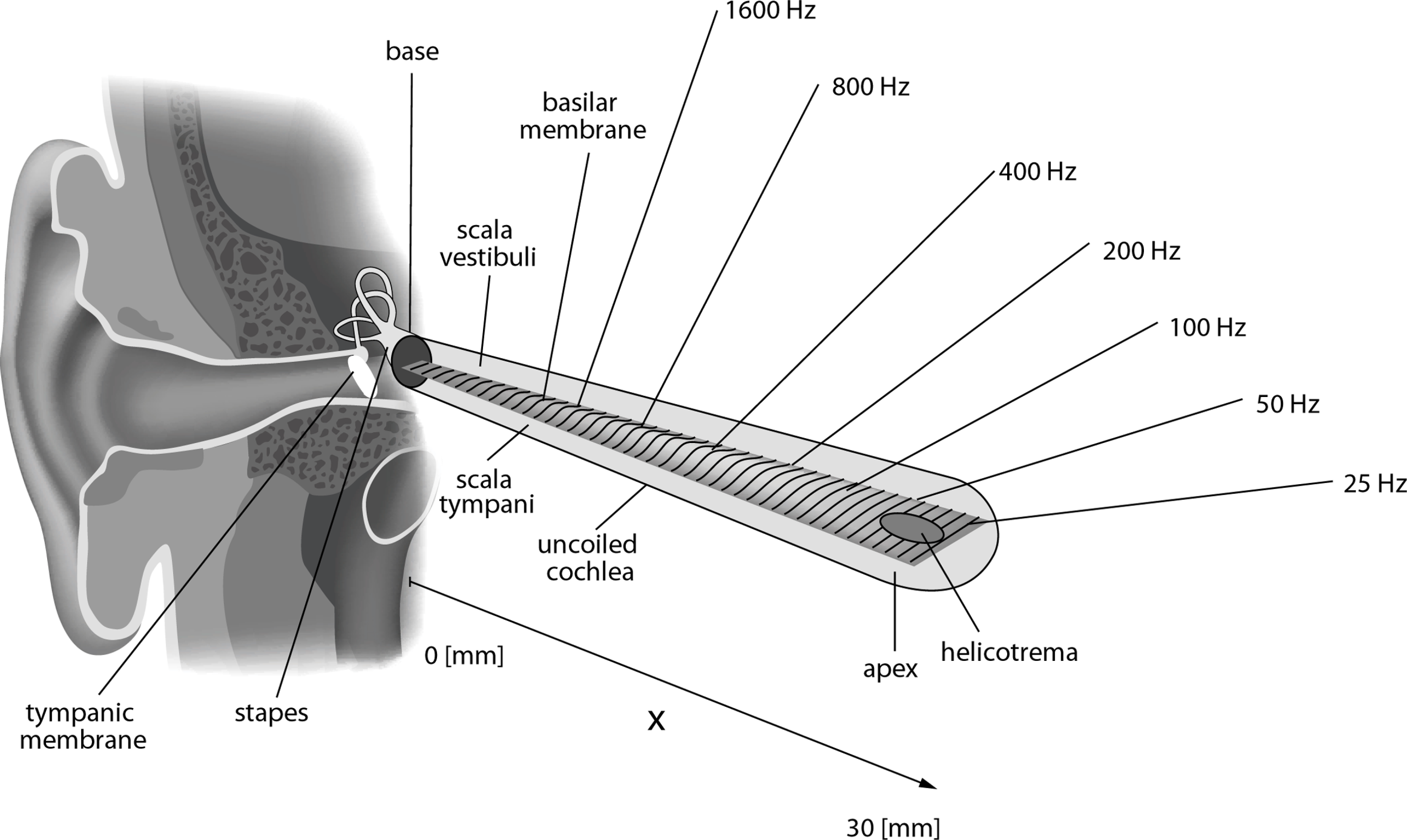
Uncoiled cochlea with basilar membrane

=== Supporting cells ===
Supporting cells are critical for maintaining inner ear sensory cells. They reside both on the surface and throughout the epithelium of the inner ear, communicating through gap junctions. Supporting cells are critical for maintaining the physical structure of the inner ear, as well as maintaining the environment of the sensory epithelium of the inner ear. Maintaining appropriate ion concentrations and pH in the inner ear epithelium is important for hair cells to initiate action potentials to transmit signals to the brain. Supporting cells are also responsible for removing damaged hair cells from the inner ear.

Outer hair cell and Deiter's cell

Hair cells and most supporting cells are ectoderm-derived. The main types of supporting cells are Hensen's cells, Deiters’ cells, Claudius cells, inner phalangeal cells, and inner and outer pillar cells. Hensen's cells, Deiter's cells, and outer hair cells make up the outer tunnel and are mainly responsible for allowing hair cells to function. Hensen's cells are columnar in shape, have many phagosomes in their cytoplasm and contain lipid droplets that correlate with the extent of their innervation. Deiters’ cells are attached to outer hair cells. They have phalanges that extend to create tight junctions with nearby outer hair cells. Because Deiters’ cells interact with outer hair cells, they play a key role in coordinating shifts and mechanical force between outer hair cells.

== Loss of hair cells ==
Hair cells are very sensitive and become damaged easily, resulting in cell death. Supporting cells can be damaged but are typically more resilient than hair cells. Hair cells die of old age, acoustic overstimulation and other traumas. Oxotoxin exposure, such as aminoglycoside antibiotics and cisplatin, is also a major contributor to hair cell death. Because mammals have very limited hair cell regeneration, hearing loss is essentially irreversible and therefore a therapeutic target for regeneration. There are also genetic diseases that can cause hair cell death such as Osteogenesis Imperfecta.

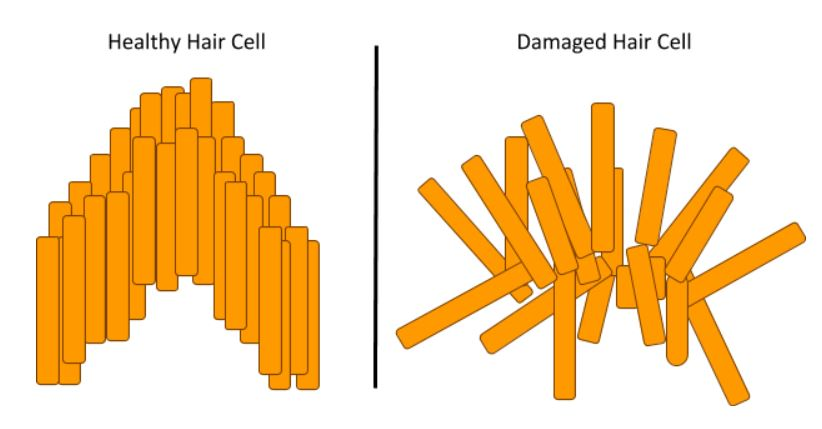
Cartoon representation of healthy vs damaged hair cells

== Current therapeutics for hair cell loss in humans ==
Because mammals have very limited hair cell regenerative capacity, humans have developed alternative methods of dealing with hearing loss. Hearing aids are devices that sit in the ear and amplify sound, which helps with age-induced partial hair cell loss. Cochlear implants are a more invasive treatment that bypass the hair cells completely by sending electrical signals from the environment straight to the auditory nerve fibers. This is a great option for patients with minimal to nonexistent hair cell activity. The cochlear implant involves a surgically implanted electrode array and an external device that processes sound.

== Hair cell regeneration ==
=== Anamniotes ===
All studied nonmammalian vertebrates can regenerate inner ear hair cells (mechanoreceptor). This means that lower vertebrates can recover from deafness due to hair cell loss. Hair cell loss triggers supporting cells to re-enter the cell cycle. Mitotic (mitosis) divisions of quiescent supporting cells in the sensory epithelium of the cochlea give rise to both new hair cells and supporting cells. In some cases, proliferating supporting cells directly transdifferentiate into new hair cells, resulting in hearing recovery. Direct transdifferentiation is when neighboring supporting cells convert into hair cells without cell division. Inner ear sensory epithelium is highly conserved (conservation genetics) in all vertebrates. The study of these nonmammalian vertebrates can lead to a better understanding of the mechanism of hair cell regeneration.

==== Zebrafish ====
The study of hair cell regeneration mechanisms in adult zebrafish may be transferable to inducing hair cell regeneration in mammals. The basic structure and function of the fish's inner ear is similar to that of other vertebrates. Mammals share homologous genes with zebrafish that are known to affect inner ear structure and function. In zebrafish, spontaneous and damage-induced hair cell regeneration has been demonstrated in the inner ear. The Stat3/SOCS3 pathway has been identified as key in promoting hair cell regeneration through stem cell activation, cell division, and differentiation.

=== Avian ===
Avian species, unlike mammals, have a significant ability to regenerate hair cells from surrounding supporting cells. There are two identified mechanisms behind hair cell regeneration; the first is that supporting cells re-enter the mitotic cycle to create and differentiate new hair cells. The second process is the direct transdifferentiation of supporting cells into hair cells, which occurs via a change in the gene expression profile of supporting cells. These two mechanisms are distinct and likely regulated in different ways to allow for spatial and temporal patterning (spatiotemporal pattern). Avian hair cells remain in a quiescent state even before birth, meaning that they are in a mitotic rest stage and do not replicate. Hair cells are only regenerated after damage. Hair cells in chicks are regenerated just three days after damage is inflicted, and the hair cells fully recover within 30 days. Supporting cells begin to replicate and form hair cells within 18–24 hours after damage, and this process peaks in 2–3 days. Despite that it is unclear which supporting cells form new hair cells in avians and whether a progenitor cell type exists, it is a promising model because of its possible applicability to humans.

=== Mammalian ===
==== Mouse ====
In the adult mouse, hair cell regeneration is not observed. However, the neonatal mouse cochlea can, to a limited extent, replace damaged or lost hair cells. Hair cell restoration can occur by direct transdifferentiation and mitotic regeneration. Mitotic division occurs when a supporting cell first divides and, subsequently, one or both daughter cells (cytokinesis) becomes a hair cell. For the neonatal mouse, both mitotic division and direct transdifferentiation occur. Proliferating supporting cells can acquire hair cell fate in mitotic division. The mouse's neonatal supporting cells proliferate after hair cell death and regenerate hair cells after damage.

The neonatal cochlea is resistant to hair cell damage caused by exposure to noise or drugs, which are toxic to the cochlea, or auditory nerve, in vivo. This regenerative capability extends up to the first postnatal week. In cell culture, the neonatal mouse's supporting cells retain the capacity to proliferate and transdifferentiate.

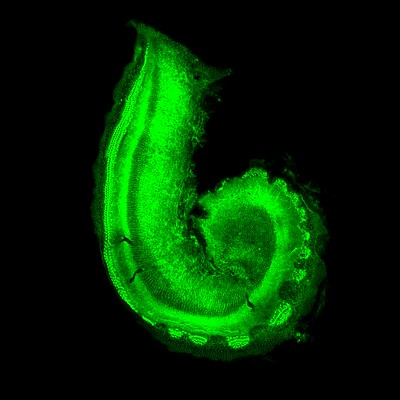
Green fluorescent protein image of the mouse cochlea

==== Human ====
In human newborns, the inner ear is fully mature. Thus, hair cell loss results in loss of hearing at any postnatal stage. The adult mammalian inner ear lacks the capacity to divide or regenerate spontaneously hair cells. This is to say that neither direct transdifferentiation nor mitotic division have the innate ability to restore hair cells. Once hair cells are damaged, hearing loss is likely permanent.

==== Inducing hair cell regeneration in mammals ====
To recover from deafness due to hair cell loss in mammals, reprogramming of adult supporting cells is likely necessary for induction of regeneration of hair cells and renewed proliferation. This has been done in adult mouse supporting cells. Cell reprogramming is the process of reverting mature, specialized cells into induced pluripotent or progenitor cells.

Supporting cells primed by exposure to the cell cycle activator Myc and the inner ear progenitor gene Notch 1 induce proliferation of adult mouse cochlear sensory epithelial cell types. Their activity enables adult supporting cells to respond to the transcription factor ATOH1 and efficiently transdifferentiate into hair cell-like cells. The mTOR pathway participates in MYC/NOTCH-mediated proliferation and regeneration. These regenerated hair cell-like cells likely form connections with adult spiral ganglion neurons. Myc and Notch 1 co-activation is sufficient to reprogram fully mature supporting cells to proliferate and regenerate hair cell-like cells in adult mammalian auditory organs.

In cell culture, neonatal mouse inner ear supporting cells retain the capacity to proliferate and transdifferentiate. Supporting cells serve essential roles in hearing balance; deficits in supporting cells can result in deafness. If supporting cells directly transdifferentiate to restore hair cell loss, there must also be some replenishment of supporting cells, which is also harmful. An ideal system for regenerating hair cells by direct supporting cell transdifferentiation would require replacement of lost supporting cells by renewed proliferation. Adult supporting cells and hair cells do not change their cell identities when dividing, which suggests limited reprogramming. In order for renewed proliferation and transdifferentiation to occur, adult supporting cells must be reprogrammed.

In the adolescent mouse, inner ear supporting cell-to-hair cell transdifferentiation can be induced by the overexpression of hair cell fate-determining transcription factor Atoh1. In the adult inner ear, overexpression of Atoh1 in supporting cells alone is inefficient in promoting hair cell regeneration. Supporting cells are the fully differentiated progeny of pluripotent progenitor cells. Those supporting cell progenitor populations are inducible to mature into cell-like hair cells. Mature supporting cells likely must regain the properties of younger biological cells in order to respond to hair cell induction signals.

Shu et al. have used adeno-associated virus-mediated delivery and inducible transgenic mouse models to demonstrate the proliferation of both hair cells and supporting cells by combined Notch 1 and Myc activation in in vitro and in vivo inner ear adult mouse models. Both hair cells and supporting cells maintain their respective identities. Reprogrammed adult supporting cells show transdifferentiation into hair cell-like cells upon exposure to hair cell induction signals (Atoh1). The mTOR pathway is downstream of Myc/Notch 1 activation and is required in proliferation and supporting cell-to-hair cell transdifferentiation in the adult cochlea. These regenerated hair cells have functional signal transduction channels, which are necessary for sensory processing. The regenerated cells appear capable of forming connections with the adult auditory system. In the mouse, Shu and others found extensive neurite outgrowth to the sensory epithelial region with neurites wrapping around new hair cell-like cells. However, in control cochleae without hair cell regeneration, virtually all the neurites retracted with few in contact with the existing hair cells.

== Obstacles and future directions ==
These inner ear regeneration studies were published on 4 December 2019 and only involved non-human cells. This therapy is cutting edge and is likely decades away from clinical application. While preclinical and clinical successes in adeno-associated virus-mediated gene therapies in humans have attributed to the popularity of this therapeutic viral vector, continued study and increased understanding of the associated therapeutic challenges will build the foundation for future clinical success. The inner ear sensory epithelium is highly conserved among vertebrates, which gives hope that animal models, especially mammal models such as mice, are very applicable to clinical use in humans. The development of human therapies require research in human mammalian cells, perhaps inner ear epithelial organoids. Studies in-vivo context are also necessary in clinical trials. These trials typically take many years; they are often unsuccessful and result in unpublished data. Reprogramming cells into another cell type by way of a pluripotent progenitor cell, including adenovirus delivery methods, risks the disrupting the genome, which may trigger the formation of a tumor/cancer. There is a long road ahead for hair cell regeneration in humans.
