= Boetcher =

Boetcher is a surname. Notable people with the surname include:

- Ib Bøtcher, also spelled Boetcher (born 1952), Danish boxer and Olympian
- Sandra Boetcher, American mechanical engineer
- Walter C. Boetcher (1881–1951), American politician

== See also ==
- Boettcher
