= Ductus reuniens =

Part of the human inner ear

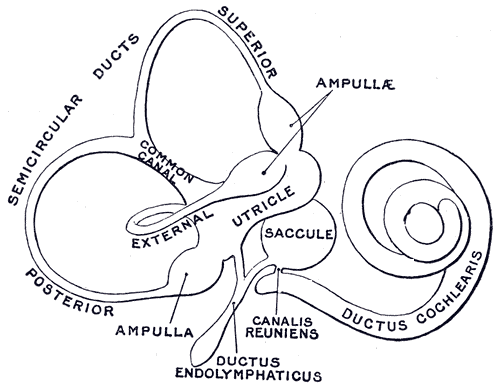
- The membranous labyrinth. (Canalis reuniens labeled at bottom center.)

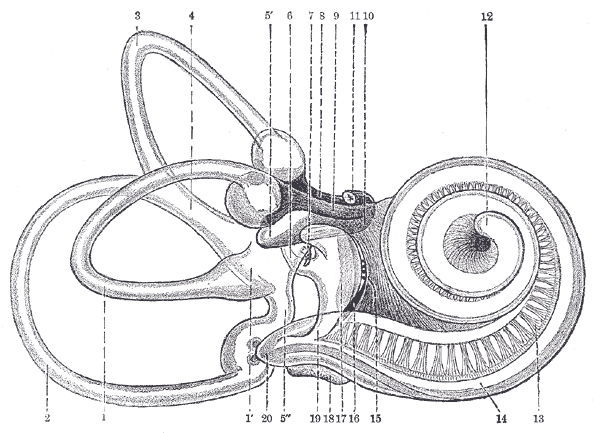
- Canalis reuniens is #19, labeled at bottom center.

Details

Identifiers
- Latin: ductus reuniens
- TA98: A15.3.03.081
- TA2: 7008
- FMA: 61252

The ductus reuniens also the canalis reuniens of Hensen is part of the human inner ear. It connects the lower part of the saccule to the cochlear duct near its vestibular extremity.

== See also ==
- Victor Hensen
