= Otolithic membrane =

Fibrous structure in the vestibular system of the inner ear

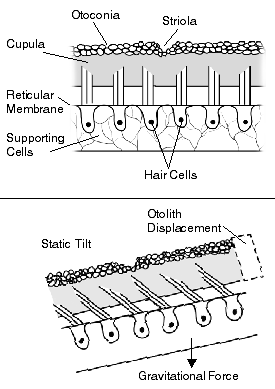

Details
- System: Vestibular system
- Location: Inner ear

Identifiers
- Latin: membrana statoconiorum
- MeSH: D010037
- TA98: A15.3.03.085
- FMA: 75573

The otolithic membrane is a fibrous structure located in the vestibular system of the inner ear. It plays a critical role in the brain's interpretation of equilibrium. The membrane serves to determine if the body or the head is tilted, in addition to the linear acceleration of the body. The linear acceleration could be in the horizontal direction as in a moving car or vertical acceleration such as that felt when an elevator moves up or down.

== Structure ==
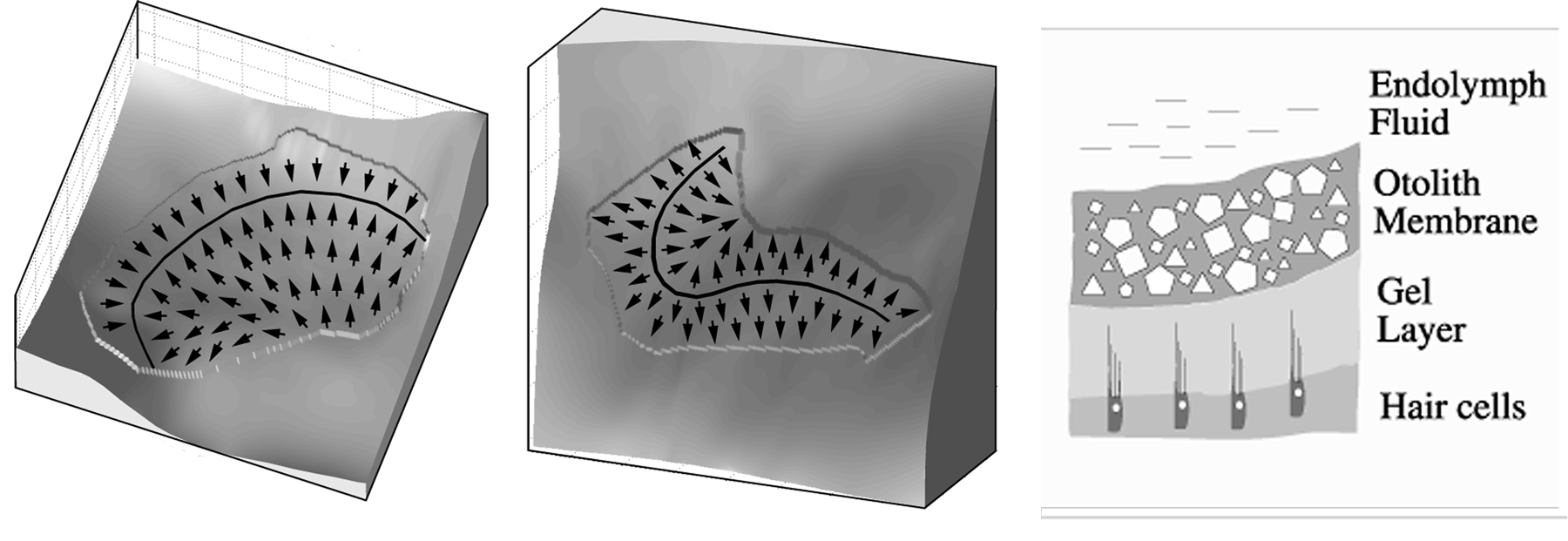
The utricle (left) is approximately horizontally oriented; the saccule (center) lies approximately vertical. The arrows indicate the local on-directions of the hair cells; and the thick black lines indicate the location of the striola. On the right you see a cross-section through the otolith membrane.

The otolithic membrane is part of the otolith organs in the vestibular system. The otolith organs include the utricle and the saccule. The otolith organs are beds of sensory cells in the inner ear, specifically small patches of hair cells. Overlying the hair cells and their hair bundles is a gelatinous layer and above that layer is the otolithic membrane. The utricle serves to measure horizontal accelerations and the saccule responds to vertical accelerations. The reason for this difference is the orientation of the macula in the two organs. The utricular macula lie horizontal in the utricle, while the saccular macula lies vertical in the saccule. Every hair cell in these sensory beds consist of 40-70 stereocilia and a kinocilium. The stereocilia and kinocilium are embedded in the otolithic membrane and are essential in the function of the otolith organs. The hair cells are deflected by structures called otoconia.

=== Otoconia ===
Otoconia are crystals of calcium carbonate and make the otolithic membrane heavier than the structures and fluids surrounding it. The otoconia are composite crystallites that overlie the macular sensory epithelium of the gravity receptors of most vertebrates and are required for optimal stimulus input of linear acceleration and gravity. Fishes often have a single large crystal called an otolith, but otoconia from higher vertebrates have numerous crystals, and each apparently single crystal in fact has multiple crystallites that are composed of organic and inorganic components. Ultra-high resolution transmission electron microscopy of rat otoconia shows that the crystallites are 50-100 nm in diameter, have round edges and are highly ordered into laminae. Biomineralization of otoliths and otoconia results mainly from the release of soluble calcium ions, which is in turn precipitated as calcium carbonate crystals.

The mechanical coupling of the otoconia to the hair cell sensory stereocilia at the surface of the vestibular sensory epithelium is mediated by two layers of the extracellular matrix, each on with a specific role in the mechanical transduction process. The first of these layers is the otolithic membrane which uniformly distributes the force of inertia of the non-uniform otoconia mass to all stereocilia bundles. The second layer formed by columnar filaments secures the membrane above the surface of the epithelium.

== Function ==
When the head tilts, gravity causes the otolithic membrane to shift relative to the sensory epithelium (macula). The resulting shearing motion between the otolithic membrane and the macula displaces the hair bundles, which are embedded in the lower, gelatinous surface of the membrane. This displacement of the hair bundles generates a receptor potential in the hair cells. In addition to aiding in the sensing of tilting, the otolithic membrane helps the body detect linear accelerations. The greater relative mass of the membrane, due to the presence of the otoconia, causes it to lag behind the macula temporarily, leading to transient displacement of the hair bundle.

One consequence of the similar effects exerted on otolithic hair cells by certain head tilts and linear accelerations is that otolith afferents cannot convey information that distinguishes between these two types of stimuli. Consequently, one might expect that these different stimuli would be rendered perceptually equivalent when visual feedback is absent, as occurs in the dark or when the eyes are closed. However, this is not the case because blindfolded subjects can discriminate between these two types of stimuli.

The structure of the otolith organs enables them to sense both static displacements, as would be caused by tilting the head relative to the gravitational axis, and transient displacements caused by translational movements of the head. The mass of the otolithic membrane relative to the surrounding endolymph, as well as the membrane's physical uncoupling from the underlying macula, means that hair bundle displacement will occur transiently in response to linear accelerations, and tonically in response to tilting of the head. Prior to tilting, the axon has a high firing rate, which increases or decreases depending on the direction of tilt. When the head is returned to its original position, the firing level returns to baseline value. In similar fashion, transient increases or decreases in firing rate from spontaneous levels signal the direction of linear accelerations of the head.

The range of orientations of hair cells within the utricle and saccule combine to effectively gauge the linear forces acting on the head at any moment, in all three dimensions. Tilts of the head off the horizontal plane and translational movements of the head in any direction stimulate a distinct subset of hair cells in the saccular and utricular maculae, while simultaneously suppressing responses of other hair cells in these organs. Ultimately, variations in hair cell polarity within the otolith organs produce patterns of vestibular nerve fiber activity that, at a population level, unambiguously encode head position and the forces that influence it.

=== Hair bundles and the otolithic membrane ===
Studies performed by a team at the University of California, Los Angeles elucidated the movement of the active hair bundle under the otolithic membrane, as well as the coupling between the hair bundles and the membrane. The researchers concluded that when coupled and loaded by the otolithic membrane, hair bundles of the bullfrog sacculus do not oscillate spontaneously but are poised in a dormant regime. However, when stimulated by a sinusoidal pulse, the bundles in the coupled system exhibit an active biphasic response similar to the "twitch" observed in individual bundles. The active bundle motion can generate sufficient force to move the otolithic membrane. Furthermore, the almost perfect entrainment between the hair bundles and the membrane demonstrates that coupling between the two is elastic rather than viscous. A further study further demonstrated that the motion evoked in the hair cell bundles induced by the otolithic membrane, was found to be highly phase-locked which was consistent over large portions of the sensory epithelium.

== Clinical significance ==
Although the pathophysiology of otolithic dysfunction is poorly understood, a disorder of otolith function, at a peripheral or central level, may be suspected when a patient describes symptoms of false sensations of linear motion or tilt or shows signs of specific derangements of ocular motor and postural, orienting and balancing responses. When disorientation is severe the patient may describe symptoms which sound bizarre, raising doubts over the organic basis of the disease. It is important to understand otolithic involvement in a wider neurological context through knowledge of the otolith physiology and the characteristics of proven otolithic syndromes.

Benign paroxysmal positional vertigo (BPPV) is the most common vestibular system disorder and occurs as a result of otoconia detaching from the otolithic membrane in the utricle and collecting in one of the semicircular canals. It is generally associated with natural age-related degeneration of the otolithic membrane. When the head is still, gravity causes the otoconia to clump and settle. When the head moves, the otoconia shift, which stimulates the cupula to send false signals to the brain, producing vertigo and triggering nystagmus. In addition to vertigo, symptoms of BPPV include dizziness, imbalance, difficulty concentrating, and nausea.

The otolithic membrane can be affected in patients with Ménière's disease. Sudden falls without loss of consciousness (drop attacks) may be experienced by some people in the later stages of the disease, when they are referred to as Tumarkin attacks, or as Tumarkin's otolithic crisis. Those who experience such attacks (probably less than 10% of people with Meniere's disease) may report a sensation of being pushed sharply to the floor from behind. The phenomenon is thought to be triggered by a sudden mechanical disturbance of the otolithic membrane that activates motoneurons in the vestibulospinal tract.

Otolithic function can also be compromised after unilateral vestibular neurectomy. The illusion is that during centrifugal stimulation, a small luminous bar, fixed with respect to the observer, appears to be roll-tilited by the same amount that the observer feels to be roll-tilted. This illusion is felt symmetrically in normal patients, but after vestibular neuroectomy, patients perceive a reduce illusion when the force is directed toward their operated ear.

== Other animals ==
Otolithic membrane structure has been frequently studied in amphibians and reptiles in order to elucidate the differences and to understand how the membrane has evolved in various otolith organs. Otolithic membranes of utricles in reptiles and amphibians represent thin plates of non-uniform structure, while the otolithic membrane in the saccule resembles a large cobble-stone-like conglomerate of otoconia. In fish, amphibians and reptiles there is also a third otolith organ that is not present in humans, and is called the lagena. The otolithic membrane in the lagena of amphibians is poorly differentiated, but well differentiated in reptiles. This difference corresponds to the fact that when vertebrates began to inhabit the earth surface there was a reorganization of the membrane. Over time, there was two changes that occurred in parallel when referring to the evolution of the otolithic membrane. First, otoliths that were present in amphibians and reptiles were replaced by a structurally differentiated otolithic membrane. Second, the spindle-shaped aragonitic otoconia were replaced by calcitic barrel-shaped otoconia. These two changes are referred to as the two directions of evolution of the otolithic membrane.

== Research ==
=== Finite element models ===
There are currently several techniques to model the otolithic membrane that all serve as a way for researchers, scientists and health professionals to illustrate and understand the membrane's structure and function. One of these techniques is referred to as a finite element method which divides the membrane into triangles and a computer is used to determine the linear combination of the functions that represent the displacement which solves a complex system of equations. The finite element method was initially developed for use in fields such as mechanical engineering and civil engineering to solve elliptic partial differential equations (PDEs) and has had enormous success. The finite element method opposes another technique for solving PDEs, the finite difference method and has been shown to be more effective in modeling the otolithic membrane by several studies, but has also been opposed by other researchers. Similar models have even been developed to take into account varying acceleration of gravity to model the effect of the otolithic membrane in environments with changing gravitational effects such as space, the Moon and other planets.

=== Finite difference models ===
The alternative method used for modeling the otolithic membrane is the finite difference method, while the finite element method has advantages in handling complicated geometry, while difference method is more easily implemented. Difference models impose a rectangular grid over the shape of the otolithic membrane and use different boundary extrapolation schemes applied to boundary conditions. Another method uses an optimization technique to generate a non-uniform grid which conforms to the shape of the membrane, and then generates a grid via general coordinate transformations. The main steps of such models include 1) place a set of points on the membrane (usually modeled as an irregular ellipse, 2) discretize partial differential equations and 3) solve the discrete equations. There are also several parameters of the otolithic membrane that are important for the modeling process. Common parameters for similar models include, the modulus of elasticity, Poisson's ratio and the specific density of the otoconia.

=== Other modeling techniques ===
One final type of model that researchers have used to understand the otolithic membrane is related to the membrane-hair cell bundle interaction. In the model, the membrane is treated as a Kelvin–Voigt material, meaning that it has both properties of viscosity and elasticity. For this technique, the process of transformation of information in the chain sensing linear acceleration is taken into account, starting from an external acceleration and ending at hair cell depolarization. The model shows that a response is dependent on two factors which are the spatial dependence of gel displacement and the spatial distribution of stereocilia height in the hair cell bundle.
