= Sacculus =

Sacculus may refer to:

- Saccule, a bed of sensory cells in the inner ear
- Sacculus (insect antenna anatomy), a sensory organ in the antenna of certain insects
- Sacculus (insect genital anatomy), a male genital structure in moths and butterflies
- Sacculus, an outer peptidoglycan meshwork that surrounds the bacterial cytoplasm
- Sacculus, the Latin word for money bag
