= Arthur Böttcher =

Baltic German scientist

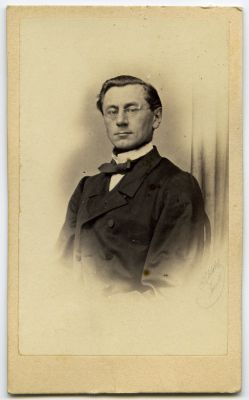
- Photograph by Georg Friedrich Schlater
- Born: Jakob Ernst Arthur Böttcher; 13 July 1831; Bauska, Courland Governorate, Russian Empire
- Died: 10 August 1889 (aged 58); Dorpat, Russian Empire
- Scientific career
- Fields: Pathology; Anatomy
- Workplaces: Imperial University of Dorpat

Jakob Ernst Arthur Böttcher (13 July 1831 – 10 August 1889) was a Baltic German pathologist and anatomist who was a native of Bauska, in what was then the Courland Governorate (present-day Latvia). He worked primarily within the Russian Empire.

In 1856 he earned his medical doctorate from the Imperial University of Dorpat (present-day University of Tartu in Estonia) with a dissertation on the nerve supply to the inner ear's cochlea. He furthered his studies with journeys to Germany, France and Austria, and in 1862 he became a full professor of general pathology and pathological anatomy at Dorpat. From 1871 to 1877 he was editor of the magazine Dorpater Medicinische Zeitschrift.

Böttcher is largely known for his anatomical investigations of the inner ear, particularly studies involving the structure of the reticular lamina and nerve fibers of the organ of Corti. Today his name is associated with the eponymous "Bottcher cells", which are cells of the basilar membrane of the cochlea. Other anatomical terms that contain his name are:

- Böttcher's canal: Known today as the ductus utriculosaccularis or as the utriculo-saccular duct. This duct connects the utricle with the endolymphatic duct a short distance from the saccule.
- Böttcher's ganglion: Ganglion on the cochlear nerve in the internal auditory meatus.
- Böttcher's space: Also known as the endolymphatic sac; the blind pouch at the end of the endolymphatic duct.
- Charcot-Böttcher filaments: Spindle-shaped crystalloids found in human Sertoli cells. They measure 10 to 25 μm in length. Named in conjunction with neurologist Jean-Martin Charcot (1825-1893).

== See also ==
- List of Baltic German scientists

== Selected publications ==
- Observationes microscopicae de ratione qua nervus cochleae mammalium terminator, 1856.
- Mittheilung über einen bester noch unbekannten Blasenwurm, 1862.
- Ueber die Entwickelung und Bau des Gehörlabyrinths nach Untersuchungen an Säugethieren, 1869.
- Kritische Bemerkungen und neue Beiträge zur Litteratur des Gehörlabyrinths, 1872.
- Neue Untersuchungen über die rothen Blutkörperchen, 1876.

== Sources ==
- Thomas Lathrop Stedman. Stedman's Medical Eponyms. 2005. Lippincott Williams & Wilkins. Page 91 (definition of eponyms)
