= Claudius cell =

Claudius cells are considered as supporting cells within the organ of Corti in the cochlea. These cells extend from Hensen's cells to the spiral prominence epithelium, forming the outer sulcus. They are in direct contact with the endolymph of the cochlear duct. These cells are sealed via tight junctions that prevent flow of endolymph between them. Boettcher cells are located immediately under Claudius cells in the lower turn of the cochlea.

Claudius cells are named after German anatomist, Friedrich Matthias Claudius (1822–1869).
