= Victor Hensen =

German zoologist (1835–1924)

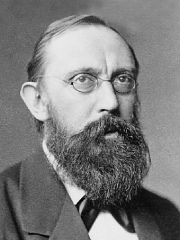
Victor Hensen

Christian Andreas Victor Hensen (10 February 1835 – 5 April 1924) was a German zoologist and marine biologist (planktology). He coined the term plankton and laid the foundation for biological oceanography and quantitative studies.

== Family ==
Hensen was born in the town of Schleswig where his father ran a school for the deaf and dumb. His mother Henriette Caroline Amalie was the daughter of physician Carl Ferdinand Suadicani who founded an asylum in Schleswig. Hensen had eight sisters and five brothers including from his father's first marriage.

== Education and work ==
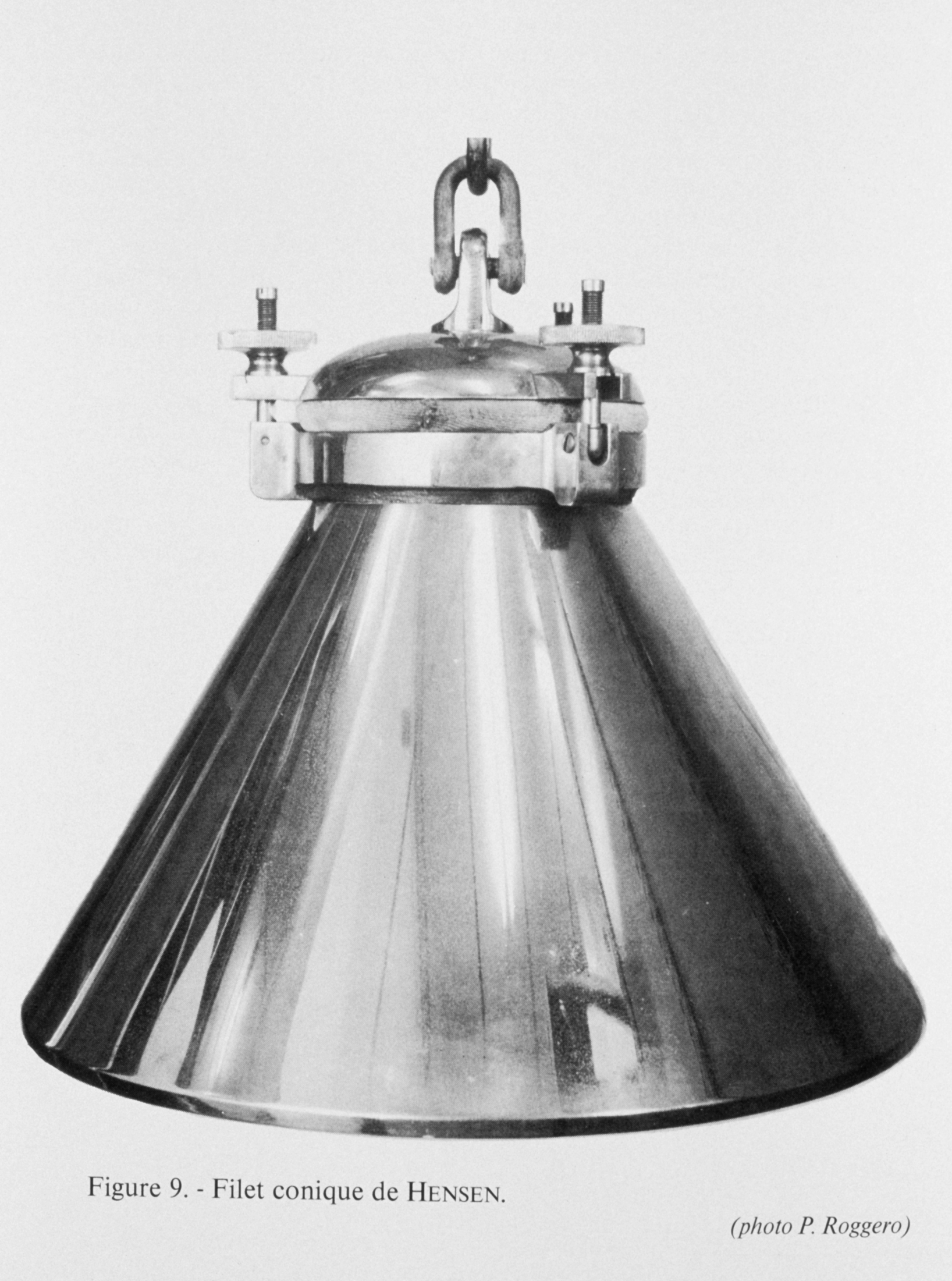
A Korbnetz, one of several inventions by Hensen to collect plankton

Hensen went to school in Schleswig from 1845 to 1859 and then joined a grammar school in Glückstadt (Holstein) after which he joined to study medicine at the universities of Würzburg, Berlin (studying under Müller) and Kiel. In 1859, he received his doctorate in Kiel for a thesis on epilepsy and urinary secretions. He worked for a while at Kiel and in 1859 he became a lecturer in anatomy and histology. He became an associate professor in 1864, succeeding Peter Ludwig Panum.

In 1867, he became a member of the Prussian House of Representatives to push towards studies of the ocean. Upon his initiative, the Royal Prussian Commission for the Exploration of the Oceans was founded. Hensen's students included Paul Höber, Hans Winterstein, and Hans Piper.

He became a professor of physiology in 1868 and worked at Kiel until 1891. During his time, he was head of five marine biological expeditions to the Baltic and North Seas, as well as the Atlantic Ocean. He led an expedition in 1889 on the steamboat National from Kiel to southern Greenland in the north to as far as near the mouth of the Amazon in Pará, Brazil in the south to study whether plankton can be found more in tropical waters than cold waters.

Hensen also worked in embryology and anatomy examining the eye of cephalopods and the hearing organs of decapods. He discovered a structure in the ear, the Hensen duct, also known as the Canal of Hensen. He also discovered Hensen's cells, Hensen's stripe, and two structures essential for the development of birds, the Hensen's node and Hensen's line.

Hensen was for several years dean of the Faculty of Medicine and several times was rector of the University of Kiel. He was honorary doctor of Kiel, a member of the Leopoldine Academy, and a corresponding member of the Bavarian and Prussian academies of science.

== Family and legacy ==
Hensen married Andrea Katharina Friederike Seestern-Pauly in 1870 and they had two sons and daughters. The RV VICTOR HENSEN is a research vessel named in his honor.

== Works ==
- Zur Morphologie der Schnecke des Menschen und der Säugethiere (1863)
