= Ephraim M. Sparrow =

American academic

- Born: May 27, 1928
- Died: August 1, 2019 (aged 91)
- Education: Massachusetts Institute of Technology; Harvard University
- Scientific career
- Fields: Fluid dynamics Heat transfer
- Workplaces: University of Minnesota
- Thesis: Free Convection With Variable Properties and Variable Wall Temperature (1952)
- Doctoral advisor: Howard W. Emmons
- Doctoral students: Sandra Boetcher

Ephraim Maurice Sparrow (May 27, 1928 – August 1, 2019) was a Professor of Engineering at the University of Minnesota. He is known for his contributions to all aspects of heat transfer and fluid mechanics. Sparrow has been listed as an ISI Highly Cited Author in Engineering by the ISI Web of Knowledge, Thomson Scientific Company.

== Academic career ==
Sparrow received his B.S. and M.S. degrees in Mechanical Engineering from Massachusetts Institute of Technology in 1948 and 1949, respectively. He then received his M.A. (1950) and Ph.D. (1952) degrees from Harvard University, both in Mechanical Engineering.

In 1959, he joined at the University of Minnesota in the department of Mechanical Engineering. During his tenure there, he served as chairman of the fluid mechanics program from 1968 to 1980. Sparrow supervised more than 100 doctoral students and more than 250 masters students. His work was published in over 850 peer-reviewed and widely cited, with over 40,000 citations at the time of his death. At the time of his death, he was both the oldest and the longest serving faculty member in the Mechanical Engineering department.

== Honors and awards ==
- Member of the National Academy of Engineering, 1986
- Fellow of the American Society of Mechanical Engineers
- Monie A. Ferst Award, 1993
- ASME Ralph Coates Roe Medal
- Max Jakob Memorial Award, 1976

== Books authored ==
- E. M. Sparrow and R. D. Cess, Radiation Heat Transfer, CRC Press, 1978. ISBN 0-89116-923-7
