= Otoconin =

Protein family

OC90

Identifiers
- Aliases: OC90, PLA2L, otoconin 90
- External IDs: OMIM: 601658; MGI: 1313269; HomoloGene: 19021; GeneCards: OC90; OMA:OC90 - orthologs

Gene location (Human)
Chr.	Chromosome 8 (human)
Band	8q24.22	Start	132,024,216 bp
Band	8q24.22	End	132,059,382 bp

Gene location (Mouse)
Chr.	Chromosome 15 (mouse)
Band	15 D1|15 29.16 cM	Start	65,747,902 bp
Band	15 D1|15 29.16 cM	End	65,784,246 bp
RNA expression pattern
Bgee	Human / Mouse (ortholog); Top expressed in: testicle; substantia nigra; placenta; prefrontal cortex; Hypothalamus; Brodmann area 9; anterior cingulate cortex; subcutaneous adipose tissue; pituitary gland / Top expressed in: vestibular sensory epithelium; saccule; otic vesicle; utricle; entorhinal cortex; perirhinal cortex; outer nuclear layer; morula; CA3 field; embryo; More reference expression data
BioGPS	n/a
Gene ontology
Molecular function	calcium ion binding; phospholipase A2 activity; molecular function; metal ion binding; structural molecule activity
Cellular component	extracellular region; cellular component; extracellular matrix
Biological process	lipid catabolic process; phospholipid metabolic process; arachidonic acid secretion; biological process; otolith mineralization; otolith development
Sources:Amigo / QuickGO
Orthologs
Species	Human	Mouse
Entrez	729330	18256
Ensembl	ENSG00000253117	ENSMUSG00000015001
UniProt	Q02509	Q9Z0L3
RefSeq (mRNA)	NM_001080399	NM_010953; NM_001347038
RefSeq (protein)	NP_001073868	NP_001333967; NP_035083
Location (UCSC)	Chr 8: 132.02 – 132.06 Mb	Chr 15: 65.75 – 65.78 Mb
PubMed search
- Wikidata
View/Edit Human	View/Edit Mouse

Oc90

Identifiers
- Aliases: Ocn-95PLA2LPla2lloc95otoconin 90
- External IDs: HomoloGene: 19021; GeneCards: ; OMA:- orthologs

Gene location (Human)
Chr.	Chromosome 15 (human)
Band	15 D1|15 29.16 cM	Start	65,747,902 bp
Band	15 D1|15 29.16 cM	End	65,784,246 bp
RNA expression pattern
Bgee	Human / Mouse (ortholog); Top expressed in: vestibular sensory epithelium; saccule; otic vesicle; utricle; entorhinal cortex; perirhinal cortex; outer nuclear layer; morula; CA3 field; embryo / n/a; More reference expression data
BioGPS	n/a
Gene ontology
Molecular function	calcium ion binding; structural molecule activity; protein binding; metal ion binding
Cellular component	extracellular region; extracellular matrix
Biological process	lipid catabolic process; phospholipid metabolic process; arachidonic acid secretion; otolith mineralization; otolith development
Sources:Amigo / QuickGO
Orthologs
Species	Human	Mouse
Entrez	18256	n/a
Ensembl	ENSMUSG00000015001	n/a
UniProt	Q9Z0L3	n/a
RefSeq (mRNA)	NM_010953; NM_001347038	n/a
RefSeq (protein)	NP_001333967; NP_035083	n/a
Location (UCSC)	Chr 15: 65.75 – 65.78 Mb	n/a
PubMed search		n/a
- Wikidata
View/Edit Human

Otoconin is a structural glycoprotein found in the otoconial membrane of vertebrates. It is the major protein component of the otoconia (ear dust).

In mice the protein is called otoconin-90, and is coded by the Ocn-95 gene. In humans the ortholog is called PLA2L, originally believed to be a pseudogene.

In mice the protein contains 469 amino acids, and is coded by 1906 base-pair DNA. In mice the protein is first formed at day 9.5 in the otic vesicle dorsal wall epithelium, and also in the endolymphatic duct. This is before any minerals are deposited. Four days later it also appears in the non-sensory epithelium of the utricle and saccule and semicircular canals. The roof of the cochlear duct also has some. By ten days after birth the protein is not found in any cells, but only in the acellular membranes.

The otoconin-90 contains two secretory phospholipase A2 (sPLA2) domains. sPLA2 has a rigid structure with eight disulfide bonds. The sPLA2 domain has the ability to bind a phospholipid, but does not have enzymatic capability. Presumably the domain also binds calcium Ca^{2+} ions and carbonate CO_{3}^{2+}. Otoconin-90 would position the ions to fit into a calcite lattice. The calcium is hypothesized to be secreted from the sensory epithelium into the gelatinous substance on the top of which it meets otoconin and forms otoconia.

In amphibians (Xenopus) a similar mass protein is contained in the utricle along with calcite. The saccule contains aragonite with otoconin-22 which is 22 kDa in mass. Otoconin-22 contains 127 amino acids. Otoconin-22 has a single sPLA2 domain.

Chondrostean fish contain a similar protein of 40 to 50 kDa mass, and vaterite as the mineral component.

In mammals otoconin makes up 90% of the protein component of an otoconium grain, primarily in the core.
