= Friedrich Matthias Claudius =

German anatomist

Friedrich Matthias Claudius (1 June 1822 – 10 January 1869) was a German anatomist who was a native of Lübeck. He was related to the German poet Matthias Claudius (1740–1815).

In 1844 he earned his doctorate from the University of Göttingen, and in 1849 was appointed to the Zoological Museum of Kiel University. In 1859 he became professor and director of the anatomical institute at the University of Marburg.

In an 1856 paper he described what were to become known as the "cells of Claudius", which are cells located on the basilar membrane of the inner ear's cochlea. His name is also associated with "Claudius' fossa", now referred to as the ovarian fossa, a depression in the parietal peritoneum of the pelvis.

In 1867 he published Das Gehörorgan von Rhytina stelleri ("The hearing organ of Rhytina stelleri ").
