= Saccular acoustic sensitivity =

Part of the human sense of hearing

Saccular acoustic sensitivity is a measurement of the ear's affectability to sound. The saccule's normal function is to keep the body balanced, but it is believed to have some hearing function for special frequencies and tones. Saccular acoustic sensitivity is considered to be simply an extension of the sense of hearing through the use of the saccule.

== Effects ==
Saccular acoustic sensitivity has a variety of physiological as well as mental/emotional effects.

=== Physical effects ===
Perhaps the most observable physical response is goose bumps. A similar effect is the manifestation of chills. Some sounds have been known to cause reflexive muscle movements like a twitch or even a jump. Since these physical effects are easily recorded and are linked consistently with strong emotion, they have been used in several types of psychological studies.

=== Mental/Emotional effects ===
Certain sounds, such as fingernails drawn down a blackboard, cause strong feelings of aversion or even fear in most humans. A 2004 study claimed that the blackboard sound was very similar to the warning cry of Siamang gibbons and hypothesized that a vestigial reflex is what causes the fight or flight reaction in humans. Other sounds, such as a person coughing or vomiting, provoke responses of disgust. These emotional reactions are thought to be caused by the body's natural tendency to avoid disease.

== Stimulation ==
=== Negative Stimulation ===
While each individual is extremely sensitive to different sounds, there are some nearly universal saccular acoustical stimulants. For example, the sound of fingernails scratching a blackboard will stimulate negative emotions along with chills in the majority of the population. Trevor J. Cox, of the University of Salford, was fascinated by this fact and conducted an online study to identify the "most horrible sound" in the world. Participants were asked to listen to recordings of various "bad" noises and rate them by their horribleness. "Vomiting" was selected as the most horrible sound by a wide margin. Surprisingly, "nails on a blackboard" was only ranked 16.

Rank	Sound Title
1	Vomiting
2	Microphone Feedback
3*	Multiple Babies Crying
3*	Scrape of Train Wheels
5	Squeak of Seesaw
6	Violin Played Badly
7*	Whoopee cushion
7*	Single Baby Crying
9*	Soap Opera Argument
9*	Mains hum
11	Tasmanian Devil
12*	Cough
12*	Cat Spitting and Howling
12*	Mobile Phone Ringing
15	Creaky Door
16*	Barking Mad Dog
16*	Sniff
16*	Fingernails on a Blackboard
16*	Polystyrene
20	Dentists' Drill
21	Cough and Spit
22	Alarm Clock
23	Fast Electrical Drilling
24	Apple Munch
25	Creaky Stairs
26*	Squeaky Trolley
26*	Snoring
28*	Electrical Throb
28*	Cat Eating Noisily
30	Reverberated Whoopee Cushion
31	Aircraft Take-off
32	Drums
33	Gong
34	Low, Not-Quite-Eerie Noise

(* signifies a tie)

=== Positive Stimulation ===
There are various sounds that correspond to positive physical and emotional reactions as well. Therapists use these soothing sounds for therapy in stress relief and relaxation. However, most of the sounds that invoke positive responses tend to be more subjective. Familiarity tends to play a large role in the amount of positive stimulation observed. For example, a man listening to a familiar song is more likely to experience pleasure and have goosebumps than a man listening to an unfamiliar song.
