= Markus Böttcher =

German actor

Markus Böttcher (born 6 July 1964 in Bonn, West Germany) is a German television actor.
