= Boettcher cell =

Special cell type located in the inner ear

Boettcher cells are a special cell type located in the inner ear.

Boettcher cells are polyhedral cells on the basilar membrane of the cochlea, and are located beneath Claudius cells. Boettcher cells are considered supporting cells for the organ of Corti, and are present only in the lower turn of the cochlea. These cells interweave with each other, and project microvilli into the intercellular space.

Because of their structural specialization, Boettcher cells are believed to play a significant role in the function of the cochlea. They demonstrate high levels of calmodulin, and may be involved in mediating Ca^{2+} regulation and ion transport. Boettcher cells are named after German pathologist Arthur Boettcher (1831-1889).

Nitric oxide synthase is detected abundantly in the cytoplasm of their interdigitations. Their ultrastructure suggests that they perform both secretory and absorptive functions. Panx1 expression has been observed.
