= Sandra Boetcher =

American mechanical engineer

Sandra Kathleen Sparr Boetcher is an American mechanical engineer specializing in heat transfer. She is a professor of mechanical engineering at Embry–Riddle Aeronautical University, where she is also interim chair of the Mechanical Engineering Department and director of the Thermal Science Laboratory.

== Education and career ==
Boetcher was a student of mechanical engineering at the University of Minnesota, where she received a bachelor's degree in 2001, a master's degree in 2003, and a Ph.D. in 2006. Her dissertation, External fluid flow and heat transfer in natural convection and forced convection, was supervised by Ephraim M. Sparrow.

Prior to joining Embry-Riddle in 2011, Boetcher worked in industry at Honeywell, 3M, and the Donaldson Company, and was a faculty member at the University of North Texas.

== Recognition ==
Boetcher received the ASHRAE Presidential Award of Excellence in 2017, and the ASHRAE E.K. Campbell Award in 2025. She was elected as an ASME Fellow in 2019, and received the ASME Dedicated Service Award in 2023.
