= Günter Böttcher =

German handball player (1954-2012)

- Born: 24 July 1954; West Germany
- Died: 4 October 2012 (aged 58); Bad Neustadt an der Saale, Germany
- Occupation: Handball player

Günter Böttcher (24 July 1954 – 4 October 2012) was a West German handball player who competed in the 1976 Summer Olympics.

In 1976 he was a part of the West German team which finished fourth in the Olympic tournament. He played in all six matches. In 2012, following a car accident that left him with severe injuries, Böttcher committed suicide in a rehabilitation clinic in Bad Neustadt an der Saale.
