= Bas Böttcher =

German writer and poetry slam performer

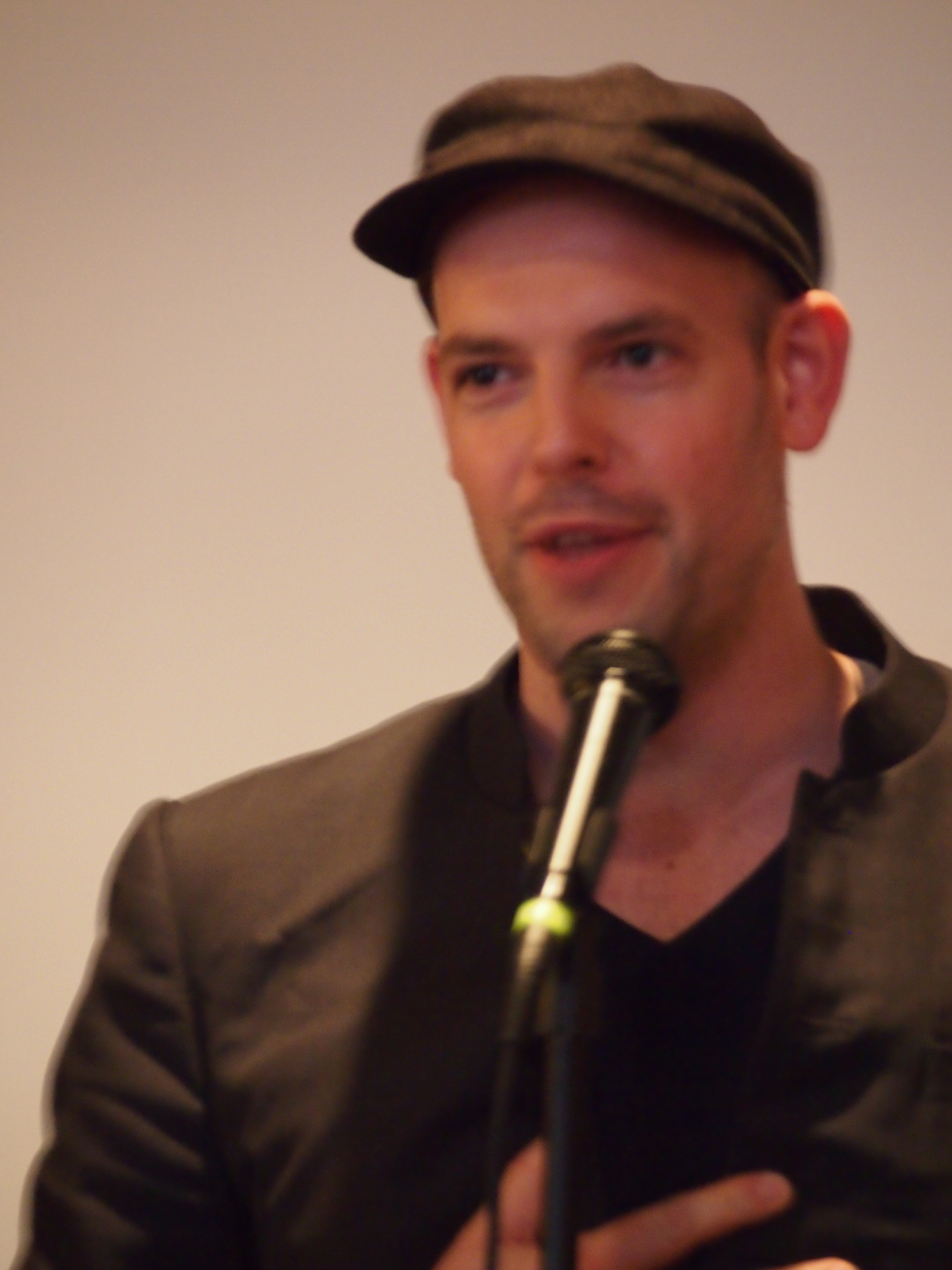
- Born: 1974 (age 51–52); Bremen, West Germany
- Education: Bauhaus University, Weimar
- Writing career
- Language: German
- Genre: Slam poetry

Bas Böttcher (born 1974 in Bremen, West Germany) is a German slam poet.

== Life ==
Bastian Böttcher studied in Weimar at the Bauhaus University, Weimar and moved in 2000 to Berlin.

Beginning in the early 90s, Böttcher developed his slam poetry as a form of rhythmic poetry physically carried forward on the stage. In 1991, with DJ Loris Negro, he founded the band centrifugal, which broke up in July 2001.

As co-founder of the German poetry slam scene, he won several times the Poetry Slam prize of Literature Workshop Berlin. The Goethe-Institut invited him to a guest performance at the German - Nuyorican Poetry Festival in New York. It was followed by appearances in the Martin-Gropius-Bau (Berlin), in the Deutsches Schauspielhaus, at the Munich Chamber games and in various literary centers of Copenhagen, to Vienna.

Böttcher is considered the first German slam poet. In 1997, he won the first German Poetry Slam Championships.

After album and anthology publications, he appeared in September 2004, with the novel megahertz (Red Book publisher) his first major literary work. In the spring program 2006 he published "This is not a concert," a collection of his stage texts. The following poems "Neonomade" (Voland & Quist, 2009), gathered more stage texts for listening and reading.

Since 2000, Bas Böttcher works with the Berlin filmmaker and Slam Master Wolf Hogekamp in the development and establishment of the poetry clip format. He produced, Various Poetry Clips lectured, together with Herbert Wentscher at the Bauhaus-University Weimar on the same subject, in 2004 put his thesis on Poetry Clips, and published in 2005 along with Wolf Hogekamp the DVD Poetry Clips (Vol 1).

In 2006, for the Frankfurt Book Fair and built Bas Böttcher the text box. The text box is a speaker cab made of Plexiglas, occur in the poets. With headphones, the audience can listen to the lyrics in studio quality. The text box has since been exhibited at the book fairs of Beijing, Taipei, Abu Dhabi, Guadalajara, Rio de Janeiro and São Paulo as well as at the Centre Pompidou (Paris) and in the Neue Nationalgalerie (Berlin).

Since 2012, Bas Böttcher is a visiting lecturer in language and staging at the German Literature Institute in Leipzig.

== Works ==
- Vorübergehende Schönheit, Voland & Quist, 2012, ISBN 978-3-86391-017-4
- Neonomade, Voland & Quist, 2009, ISBN 978-3-938424-35-3
- Die Poetry-Slam-Expedition: Bas Böttcher, Schroedel Verlag, 2009, ISBN 978-3-507-47061-3
- Dies ist kein Konzert, Voland & Quist, 2006, ISBN 3-938424-11-7
- Greinus/Wolter (ed.), Live und Direkt - Clubgeschichten, Anthologie, Voland & Quist, ISBN 978-3-938424-00-1
- Greinus/Wolter (ed.), Slam 2005 - Die Anthologie zu den Poetry Slam Meisterschaften, Anthologie, Voland & Quist, 2005, ISBN 3-938424-08-7
- Poetry Clips (Vol. 1), Lieblingslied-Records, 2005, ISBN 3-938424-02-8
- Megaherz, Roman, Rotbuch Verlag, 2004, ISBN 3-434-53132-7
- Das Gedicht, Anton G. Leitner Verlag
- Der neue Conrady, Artemis & Winkler (mit dem Spoken Word-Text „Kleine Einladung“)
- Social Beat / Slam Poetry – Texte für die 90er, Ithaka Verlag
- Boris Kerenski, Sergiu Ştefănescu (ed.), Kaltland Beat. Neue Deutsche Szene. Texte aus dem Substanz, SubVers-Verlag 1999, ISBN 3-933545-07-2
