= Böttcher America =

Böttcher America Corporation
- Company type: Corporation
- Industry: Manufacturing
- Founded: 1982
- Headquarters: Belcamp, Maryland, United States
- Area served: USA, Canada, Mexico
- Key people: David Dinsmore (President)
- Products: Printing rollers, Printing chemistry, Printing blankets
- Parent: Felix Böttcher
- Website: www.bottcher.com

Böttcher America Corporation, a subsidiary of the German firm Felix Böttcher GmbH & Co., manufactures and sells materials for the printing industry in North America since 1982. Böttcher America is headquartered in Belcamp, Maryland United States and employs over 200 employees.

== History ==
Böttcher America was established in 1982, when the German firm Felix Böttcher GmbH & Co. purchased Harrigan Rollers located in Baltimore, Maryland. Harrigan Rollers was a company dealing in rollers, printing blankets and maintenance products but without a plant of its own. Five years later, a Böttcher America production plant was built at a new site in Belcamp, Maryland. The company also set-up numerous sales offices throughout the continental United States. Building extensions were made to the Belcamp location in 1994 and 1996. Two more production plants were opened in Indianapolis and Tipton, Indiana in 1997. In 2003, the company opened another manufacturing facility in Yuma, Arizona. Since 2000, Böttcher America continues to expand its facilities with chemical manufacturing and blanket conversions. Böttcher America is also in charge of Böttcher Canada and Böttcher Mexico.

== Products ==
Böttcher America today manufactures and sells materials for the printing industry: printing rollers, printing blankets, and printing chemicals such as press washes, fountain solutions, and printing aids. These products can be used for a variety of markets (offset printing, rotogravure, flexography and digital printing). Böttcher America can supply rollers to customers as either "exchange" or "recover". The "Roller Recover Program" allows customers to send Böttcher America used rollers to be recovered with new rubber. A customer can also order rollers through the "Exchange Roller Program" and a press-ready roller will be shipped. The customer is billed for the rubber only and has 60 days to return the core(s).

Böttcher is the OEM roller supplier to the major sheet-fed press manufacturers including Heidelberg, MAN Roland, KBA, Komori and Mitsubishi.

Böttcher America has won two awards for its products. In 1993, the company won a GATF award in recognition of the glaze free rollers technology (79 Series Rubber Compounds). In 2005, Böttcher America won a new PIA/GATF award for its Chameleon rubber roller compound which enables printers to switch freely among different inks (conventional, UV or hybrid) without changing printing rollers.

== Locations ==
Böttcher America has five manufacturing locations in the United States. One of the plants is located in Belcamp, Maryland (North American headquarters) and the four other locations are found in Indianapolis, Indiana, Tipton, Indiana, Yuma, Arizona, and Dexter, Michigan. Facilities located in Maryland and Indiana manufacture rollers and also convert blanket material. Böttcher America also has a chemical mixing facility in Dexter, Michigan.

== Literature ==
- Klara van Eyll, Böttcher 1725–2000, The history of a family enterprise, Cologne 2000
