= Macula of saccule =

Details

Identifiers
- Latin: macula sacculi
- TA98: A15.3.03.084
- TA2: 7002
- FMA: 74944

The saccule is the smaller sized vestibular sac (the utricle being the other larger size vestibular sac); it is globular in form, and lies in the recessus sphæricus near the opening of the scala vestibuli of the cochlea. Its anterior part exhibits an oval thickening, the macula of saccule (or saccular macula), to which are distributed the saccular filaments of the acoustic nerve.

The vestibule is a region of the inner ear which contains the saccule and the utricle, each of which contain a macula to detect linear acceleration. Its function is to detect vertical linear acceleration.

The macula of saccule lies in a nearly vertical position. It is a 2mm by 3mm patch of hair cells. Each hair cell of the macula contains 40 to 70 stereocilia and one true cilia, called a kinocilium. A gelatinous cover called the otolithic membrane envelops the tips of the stereocilia and kinocilium. The otolithic membrane is weighted with small densely packed protein-calcium carbonate granules called statoconica.

The macula of the utricle is in a horizontal position and detects horizontal acceleration. The coordinated sensory perception of acceleration both vertically and horizontally along the vestibular nerve, allow for the perception of linear acceleration in any direction.

In vertical linear acceleration, the weighted otolithic membrane lags behind the stereocilia and kinocilium. This bends the stereocilia, which is interpreted by the brain as vertical linear acceleration.
