= Hensen's cell =

Hensen's cells
- Schematic anatomy of the Organ of Corti, with Hensen's cells at 10

Details
- System: Supporting system

Hensen's cells are a layer of tall supporting cells around the outer hair cells (OHC) in the organ of Corti in the cochlea. Their appearance are upper part wide with lower part narrow, column like cells. One significant morphologic feature of Hensen's cells is the lipid droplets, which are most noticeable at the third and forth turns of the cochlear, the lipid droplets are thought to have association with the auditory process because they are parallel to the innervation. One significant structure found among the Hensen's cells and the hair cells are the gap junctions, which are made of connexins which serve important functions in distribution and connection between cells; the gap junctions enable long distance electrical communication.

Hensen's cells are critical in many functions; they act as mediators of ion metabolism, the K+ spatial buffering pathway, and neuron innervation; and the purinergic receptors found in the Hensen's cells are important in providing a suitable electrical and micro-mechanical environment to support hair cells and to maintain homeostasis of the Organ of Corti. Furthermore, Hensen's cells are also able to regenerate the damaged hair cells in some vertebrates; they undergo phagocytosis to eject the dead or injured hair cells, and reproduce both new hair cells and supporting cells into the cell cycle. One of the reasons is that the supporting cells are differentiated by the embryonic hair cells, but why the regeneration function is not found in mammals' cells remain unclear. Hensen's cells are currently being investigated to be promising targets for gene therapy and regenerative medicine.

Hensen's cells are named after German anatomist and physiologist, Victor Hensen (1835–1924).

== Location ==
Hensen's cells are one of the supporting cells found in the cochlea, and are located on the third row outer hair cells in the Organ of Corti.

== Structure ==
The shape of Hensen's cells differs depending on their position in the cochlea; they appear as a single layer of cells in the basal coil and have a cuboidal form in the apical surface. They contain nuclei and microvilli but are limiting of plasma membrane, they are also lack of endoplasmic reticulum and have few mitochondria. In the apical surface, there are free enlarged poles found in the Hensen's cells, the cytoplasm of the cells is a little more dense in the apical surface than the cells in the basal coil. The enlarged poles in the cells which nearly fill the cytoplasm are lipid droplets, which are noticeable at the third and forth turns of the cochlea, the lipid droplets are thought to have relation with auditory process. The phagosomes found in the cells are another characteristic of the Hensen's cells, indicating that they have a function of phagocytosis. Hensen's cells have rigid cytoskeletons which are responsible to maintain the structure of the organ of Corti during sound exposure.

There are gap junctions among supporting cells and also between supporting cells and hair cells, the gap junctions are made of connexins which are three times denser in the apex than the base. The gap junctions play an important role in regulating the concentration of intracellular K+ between the endolymph and the perilymph, maintaining pH homeostasis, and increasing movement of the ions between cells. The mutations in connexin 26, which is an important gap junction protein found in the organ of Corti, would results in severe hearing loss and is one of the most common inherited nonsyndromic deafness.

There are nerve fibres and terminals innervation in the Hensen's cells, these nerve fibers are chemical synapses which located on the supranuclear region of the outer hair, and are more common in the apical surface than the basal of the cochlea. The terminals, on the other hand, are more common in the basal of the cochlea, and contain mitochondria, Golgi apparatus and dense core vesicles. The innervation of the supporting cells were shown by the finding of synaptophysin-immunostained terminals in the guinea pigs and rats.

The structural change after sound exposure in the Hensen's cells were observed by laser scanning confocal microscopy (LSCM), it showed that after sound exposure, the Hensen's cells moved towed the tunnel of Corti, most of the movement were found in the third row of outer hair cells around with outer part rotates, furthermore, the movement often accompanied with the tilting of the reticular lamina located on the first row of the outer hair cells. When there is no exposure to sound, the displacement is reversed, no residual structural alterations were observed.

== Function ==
There are increased evidence indicating that supporting cells serve many critical functions within the Organ of Corti, they may mediate the initiation of hearing activate during cochlea development. Hensen's cells are important in ion metabolism and homeostasis regulation of both endolymph and perilymph, modulation of the hearing sensitivity, regulation and regeneration of the hair cells, and prevention of the cochlea damage. The outer hair cells of the cochlea preprocess the signal by active movements, which can be elevated by electrical or chemical stimulation.

=== Gap junction ===
The supporting cells including Hensen's cells and Deiter's cells which surround the sensory cells in the organ of Corti are joined by gap junctions, the gap junctions function as electrical and metabolic communication from cell to cell through a long distance. The gap junctions could be visualized by the dye coupling, but is only visible between the Hensen's cells and the Deiter's cells by means of fluorescein of 6-carboxy-fluo-rescein. The same results were obtained by using Lucifer yellow due to its precipitation in the potassium rich cytoplasm. Gentamicin, which is an antibiotic, would induce production of oxygen free radical and suppress the cell coupling up to 90%. Other chemicals such as Calmodulin antagonists W7 and trifluoperazine (TFP) could also induce the gap junctions uncoupling. Because of the distributing and connecting function of the gap junctions, they serve as syncytium in the organ of Corti and are involved in adjusting function in the cochlea. Another way to observe the gap junctions is using ionic coupling; this method was arrived at from the observation that the intracellular membrane potentials of the Hensen's cells are almost always larger than in the intercellular space, which is larger than the outer tunnel of Corti. Since the Hensen's cells are separated from the outer hair cells, the signaling pathway would expressed by ionic coupling. It is said that the alternating potentials in the Hensen's cells which exceed the intercellular space membrane potentials are important for the existence of the gap junctions.

=== Ion homeostasis ===
ATP can induce potassium current on Hensen's cells and also elevate the concentration of cytoplasmic calcium in both the inner and outer hair cells. Under negative potential condition, ATP is able to activate a biphasic current which increased the concentration of calcium in the Hensen's cells, following by a reversal potential which induced another current that was carried by chloride. When ATP induced an increase in cytoplasmic calcium, membrane becomes depolarized and the outer hair cells are contracted.

Purinergic receptors have been found in the cells of the Organ of Corti, which are able to mediate physiological and pathophysiological actions. There are various types of purinergic receptors, the most common expressed in the Hensen's cells is the P2 subtype. Another metabotropic P2Y receptor subtypes are also expressed in the cochlea, P2Y1, P2Y2, P2Y4, and P2Y6 are found in the Hensen's cells. The P2X is ionotropic and P2Y is metabotropic, which have different functions at different sites in the organ of Corti, for example, P2X2 receptor subunits are able to mediate ATP-induced reduction in endo cochlear potential, which are responsible for the protection of the cochlear when responding to loud noise. After the noise exposure, the ATP levels elevated and change the K+ conductance through the P2X receptors by reducing the endo cochlear potential (EP). As a result, the purinergic signaling mechanism act as a regulation of homeostasis which decrease the cochlear sensitivity to noise exposure, loss function of the purinergic receptors expressed in the Hensen's cells in the cochlea may lead to noise-induced hearing loss (NIHL). NIHL could also happen if there is elevated Ca2+ concentration in the cochlea. The ionized calcium plays a critical role in many functions, such as cell proliferation, differentiation, and cell apoptosis, there are several factors that cause the increased concentration in the cochlea, including continuous exposure to noise which lead to overstimulation, thus maintaining homeostasis of the Ca2+ concentration is important.

Many studies showed that the Hensen's cells have a resting potential ranging from -60 to -100 mV, as a result, the homeostasis of K+ concentration is important in maintaining the resting potential of the Hensen's cells. A high concentration of K+ would lead to depolarization of Hensen's cells and maintain a high level of endo cochlear potential, and the change in endo cochlear potential could lead to hearing loss. Since there are abundant ATP receptors found on the membrane of Hensen's cells, the extracellular ATP flow into the cells would have significant dose-dependent suppressive effect on the EP, ATP modulate the flow of K+ and thus maintain the homeostasis of K+. When exposing to sound, the K+ concentration would decrease in the endolymph while the concentration is increase in the space of Nuel which surround the hair cells, the transportation of the K+ indicates the transduction between the supporting cells and the hair cells, and the supporting cells are associated with the K+ buffering in the cochlea, the K+ buffering is usually mediated by glial cells in the nervous system.

=== Cell regeneration ===
When the hair cells undergo apoptosis, the surrounding supporting cells would eject the injured hair cells out of the epithelium or by phagocytosis, and regenerate both new hair cells and supporting cells in vertebrates. however, studies found that humans and other mammals are unable to replace the damaged hair cells, the loss of hair cells could lead to permanent deafness. In addition to hair cell regeneration, supporting cells also act as mediators to hair cell survival. When under heat stress condition, the supporting cells could express heat shock protein 70 (HSP70) which is not up regulate in hair cells. Therefore, supporting cells could act as determinants of whether the hair cells be dead or alive. The supporting cells capacity to form new hair cells change at different time, it is most abundant in the embryonic Organ of Corti, and substantially decreased when maturing. The supporting cells are differentiated from the hair cells, when early embryonic hair cells express ligands that bind to the Notch receptors would prevent them from obtaining the hair cell phenotype, and these cells would differentiate into supporting cells, this is one of the reasons that the supporting cells are able to regenerate new hair cells.

The regeneration of hair cells by supporting cells in the vertebrates were proved by the expression of green fluorescent protein (GFP) found in the neonatal cochlear in mice. To test the capacity of supporting cells to generate hair cells in different stages, analyzing the p27–gfp transgenic organ of Corti from mice, the transgenic expression confirmed high level of Hensen's cells marker expression. It is found that greater than 80% of regeneration of hair cells from supporting cells were activated between embryonic 13 and 14, than rapid decrease after this stage. There are two types of cadherins found in the reproduction of the hair cells in the birds, one is N-cadherin and the other is E-cadherin, the expression of E-cadherins are found among supporting cells, which indicates that the interactions between two supporting cells will be mediated by the E-cadherins, and some of the N-cadherins as well, while N-cadherins alone are found in the interactions between supporting cells and the hair cells. Studies also found that the N-cadherins are associated with the supporting cells proliferation, meaning that the malfunction of the N-cadherins, which often causes hair cells loss or injury, would lead to the regeneration of hair cells by the activation of the supporting cells.

== See also ==
List of distinct cell types in the adult human body
