= Diana Tishchenko =

Ukrainian classical violinist (born 1990)

- Діана Тищенко
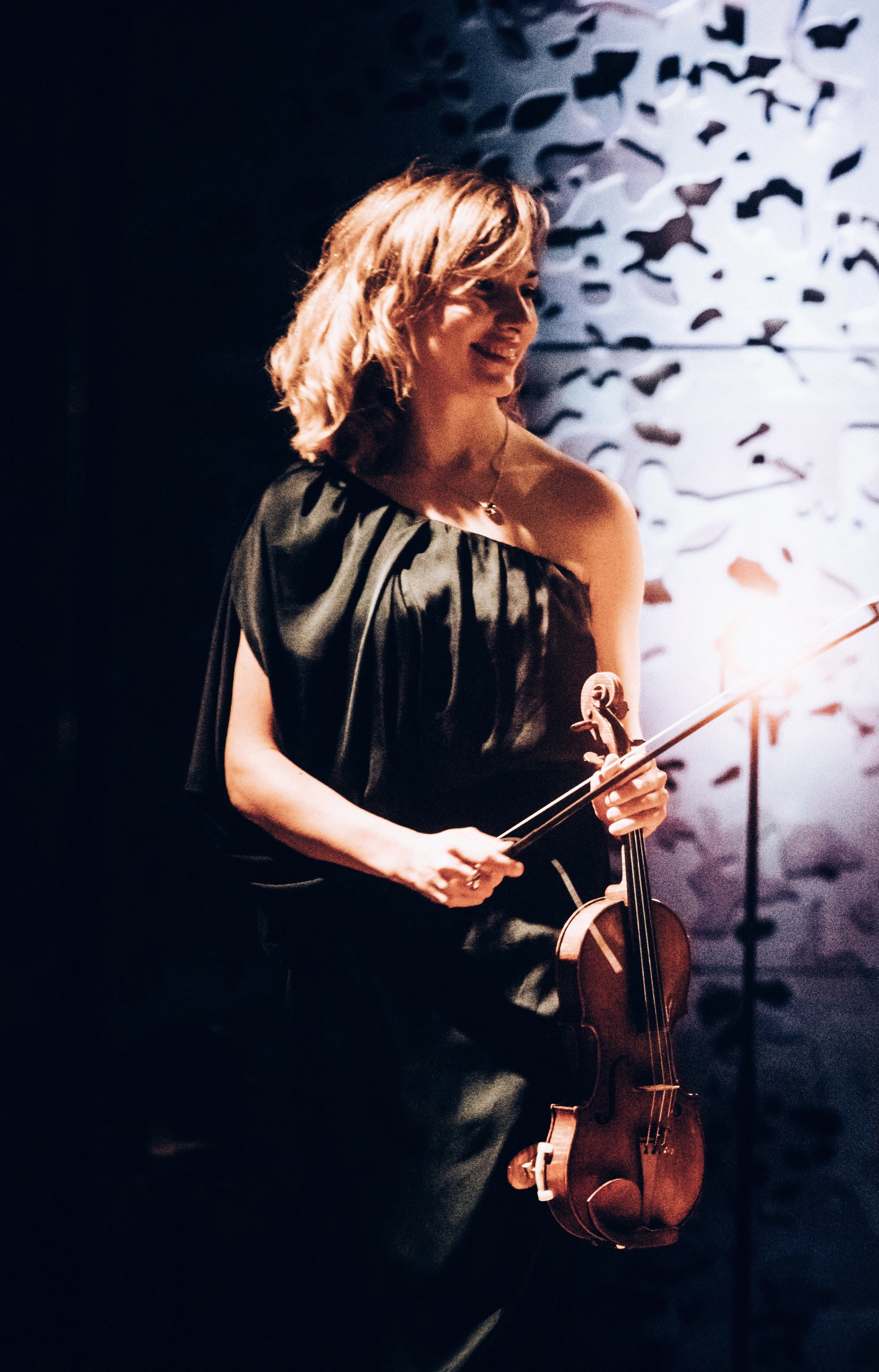
- Tishchenko at the Philharmonie de Paris
- Born: 1990 (age 34–35); Simferopol, Crimea, Ukraine
- Citizenship: Germany, Ukraine
- Education: Hochschule für Musik Hanns Eisler Berlin; University of Music and Performing Arts Graz
- Occupation: Classical violinist
- Awards: ARD International Music Competition; ECHO Rising Star
- Website: dianatishchenko.com

Diana Tishchenko (Ukrainian: Діана Тищенко; born 1990) is a Ukrainian born classical violinist and the winner of the International Long Thibaud Crespin Competition in Paris 2018. Named "Rising Star" by the European Concert Hall Organisation (ECHO) in 2020, she has performed at the leading concert halls of Europe.

== Career ==
Born in Simferopol on the Crimean Peninsula, Tishchenko started playing the violin with her aunt at the age of 6, making her debut performance with the Crimean Philharmonic Orchestra conducted by Alexey Gulianitzky at the age of 8, playing a violin concerto by Charles Beriot. She studied further at the Lysenko Specialized Music School in Kyiv with Tamara Mukhina. She played in the Gustav Mahler Youth Orchestra from age 18, later serving as the orchestra's youngest concertmaster, until 2013, collaborating with conductors such as Colin Davis, Franz Welser-Möst, Herbert Blomstedt, Antonio Pappano and Daniele Gatti. She achieved her MA and concert diploma from the Hochschule für Musik Hanns Eisler Berlin, where she studied with Ulf Wallin. She also studied with Boris Kuschnir at the University of Music and Performing Arts Graz.

Tishchenko was a laureate at the ARD International Music Competition in Munich in 2013. She won the Lyon International Chamber Music Competition in the violin and piano duo category in 2014, and the Felix Mendelssohn-Bartholdy Music Academy Berlin Competition in 2017. She was awarded the Grand Prix Jacques Thibaud at the Long Thibaud Crespin Competition in Paris.

In 2018, she participated in the festival of the Kronberg Academy, playing chamber music with Gidon Kremer, Steven Isserlis and Christian Tetzlaff, among others. She released her first solo album in 2019, Strangers in PARadISe.

Tishchenko was a Rising Star of the European Concert Hall Organisation (ECHO) in 2020/21. She was soloist in a series of concerts given by the Kyiv Symphony Orchestra touring Germany in April and May 2022, conducted by Luigi Gaggero. She played Chausson's Poème and Skoryk's Melody in A minor (1982) at the Berliner Philharmonie, the Gewandhaus in Leipzig and the Kulturpalast in Dresden.

In the 2020s Tishchenko collaborated with Ukrainian-Dutch composer Maxim Shalygin on several notable works:

- "KAYA" for Violin and Piano (2019): Tishchenko premiered this piece in 2022 with José Gallardo during their ECHO Rising Stars tour.
- "DIANA" (2022): This composition was dedicated to Tishchenko by Shalygin, highlighting their artistic partnership.

Tishchenko's performances of Shalygin's works have been praised for their expressive depth and technical proficiency. In a review of her performance alongside pianist José Gallardo at LSO St Luke's in London on 18 November 2022, her rendition of "KAYA" was noted for its "extremes of expression," demonstrating her ability to navigate complex contemporary compositions with conviction.

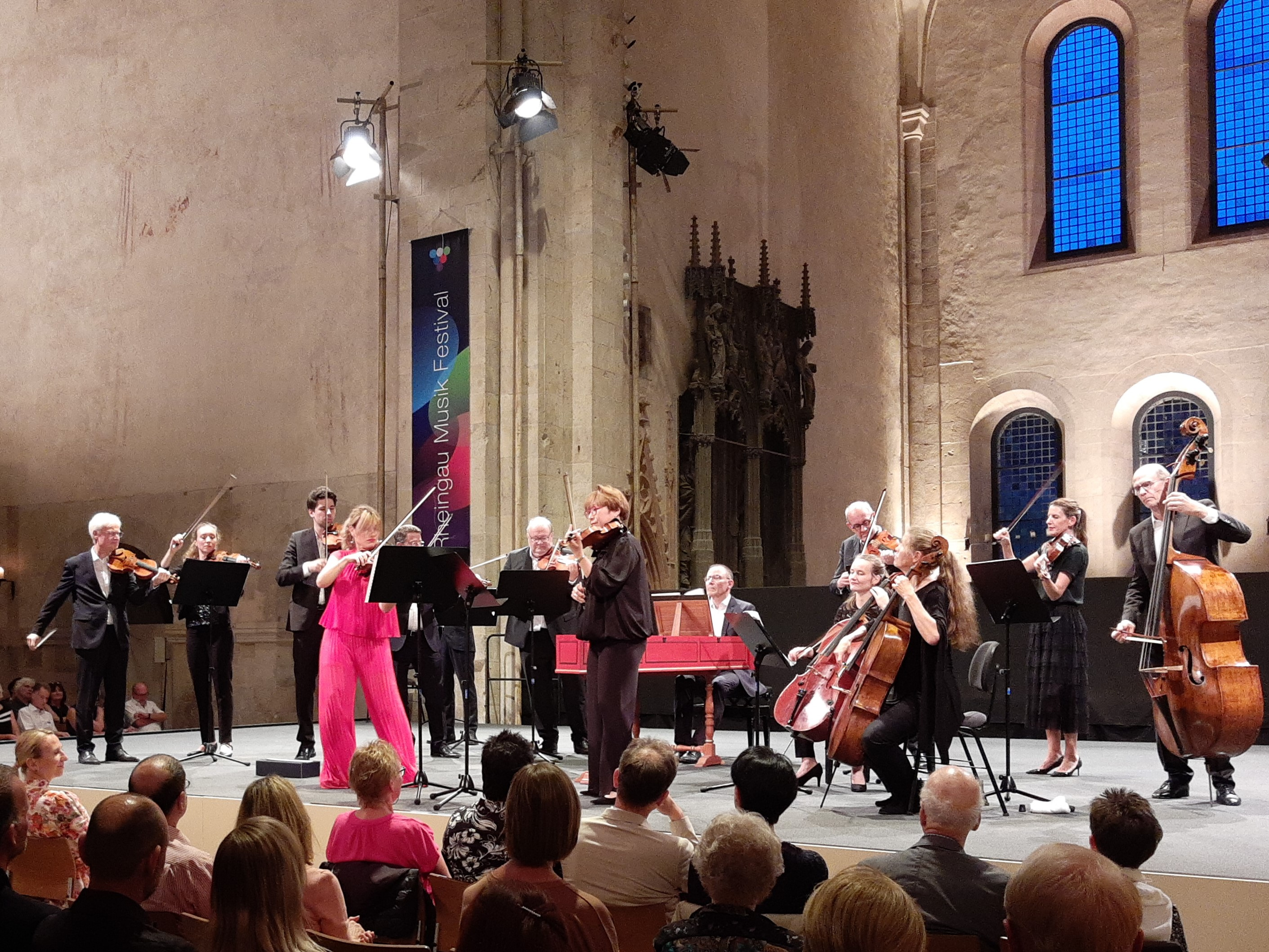
RMF Venetian Night 2023, Vivaldi's Violin Concerto in A minor, RV 522

In 2023, she played Baroque violin concertos in a concert with the Berliner Barock Solisten at Eberbach Abbey for the Rheingau Musik Festival.

Tishchenko is based in Berlin.
