= Antonii Baryshevskyi =

Ukrainian concert pianist

Antonii Baryshevskyi Антоній Сергійович Баришевський
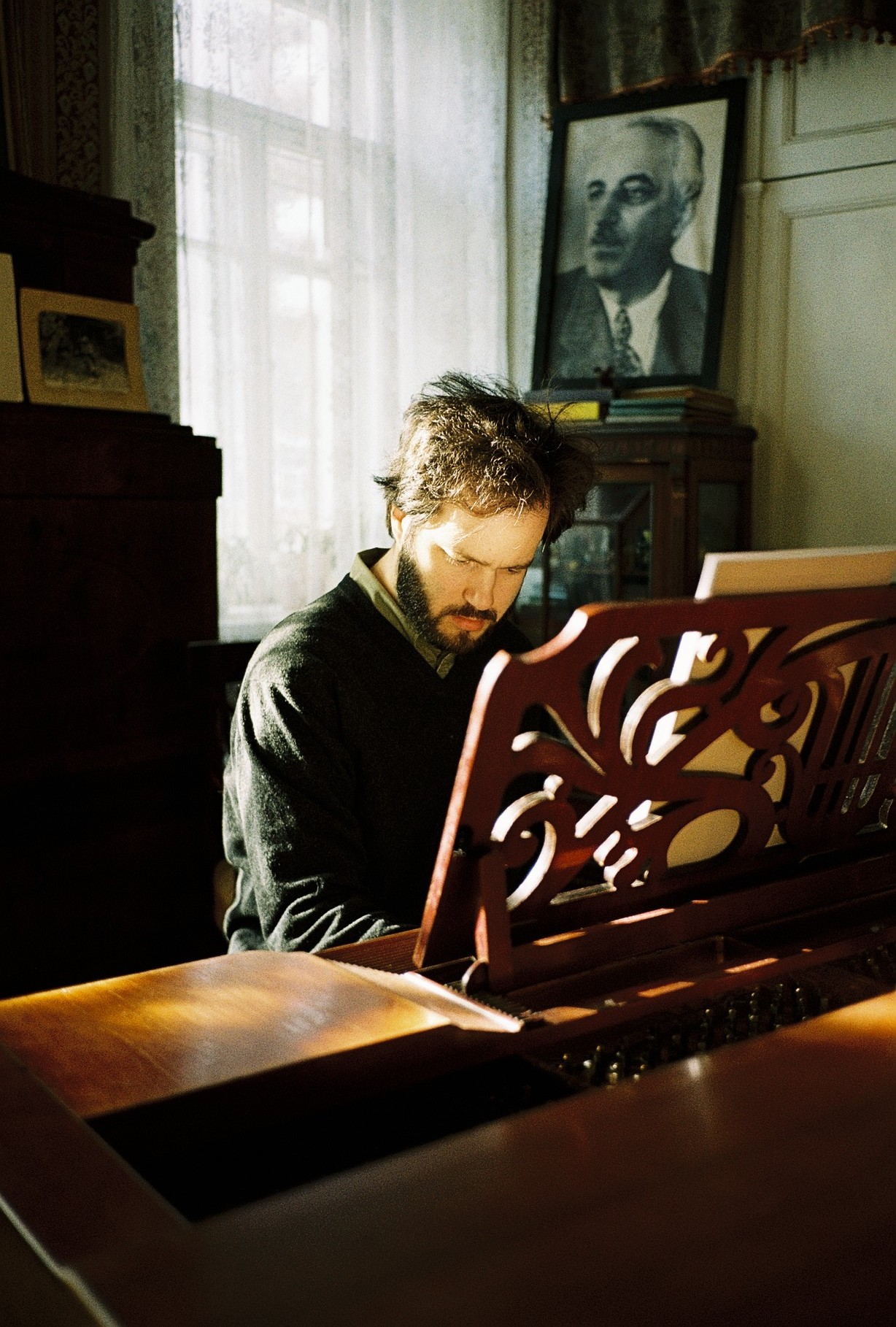

Background information
- Born: October 10, 1988 (age 37); Kyiv, Ukraine
- Genres: Classical music
- Occupation: Musician
- Instrument: Piano
- Website: https://www.antoniibaryshevskyi.com

Antonii Baryshevskyi (Ukrainian: Антоній Сергійович Баришевський) is a Ukrainian concert pianist. He won first prize at the Arthur Rubinstein International Piano Master Competition and second prize at the Ferruccio Busoni International Piano Competition. Baryshevskyi performs as soloist, chamber musician and with symphony orchestras.

== Life and work ==
=== Early life and education ===
Baryshevskyi born in Kyiv, Ukrainian SSR. Started playing piano at the age of seven. First teachers were Alina Sorkina and Rita Donska. After his graduation from the Mykola Lysenko Kyiv Specialized Music Boarding School in 2007, he entered the National Music Academy of Ukraine, where he also had an internship in the class of Professor Valeriy Kozlov. In 2013-2015 he studied at the École Normale de Musique de Paris in the class of Professor Marian Rybicki. Baryshevskyi participated in the Master Classes with Profs. Daniel Pollack, Lily Dorfman, Аlfred Brendel, Richard Goode. At the age of 16 he became a laureate of the Ukrainian program "A Man of the Year 2005″. A year later participated at the 2006 Euro Radio Youth Concert in Munich, Germany.

=== Career ===
From 2012 to 2023 he was artist in residence in Kyiv Philharmonic.

Baryshevskyi has played with leading European orchestras such as the Munich Radio Orchestra, the Israeli Philharmonic Orchestra, the Heidelberg Philharmonic Orchestra, the Granada City Orchestra, under the direction of Asher Fish, Frederick Chaslin, Howard Griffiths, Douglas Bostock, Gerd Albrecht, Roman Koffman, Marcus Bosch, Valentine Uryupin, Oksana Lyniv, Kiril Karabits, Andrzej Boreyko and many others.

Baryshevskyi performed at venues such as Wigmore Hall, Konzerthaus Berlin, Berliner Philharmonie, Kölner Philharmonie, Concertgebouw Amsterdam, Warsaw Philharmonic and Teatro Comunale di Bologna, Muziekgebouw aan 't IJ, De Doelen, Rotterdam.

Baryshevskyi gives master classes in Ukraine and abroad. He is a guest professor in Davidsbündler Music Academy in the Hague, Netherlands.

=== Recent years ===
Baryshevskyi played a concert in Kyiv Philharmonic on 22 February 2022, the day before the Russian invasion of Ukraine. On the first day of the war he went to Lviv and start volunteering. In an interview with Michael Ertl for BBC World Service he said: "First few days we were making camouflage nets and then we thought maybe we can do something more. My goal now is to show Ukrainian music."

Baryshevskyi organised and played a charity video concert on 23 March 2022, together with violinist Aleksey Semenenko and others, to help colleagues. After he was permitted to leave the country, he made his way to the Netherlands. From 2023 he is artist-in-residence at Splendor (Amsterdam). In October 2023 Baryshevskyi and violinist Alexey Semenenko accompanied the National Symphony Orchestra of Ukraine's tour of the United Kingdom as alternating soloists.

An arrangement forpiano four hands of Maxim Shalygin's Drop after Drop (2022) was performed as an encore by Baryshevskyi and Anna Fedorova on 13 January 2024 at the Concert for Ukraine at the De Doelen, Rotterdam, The Netherlands. Commissioned by Festivals for Compassion for string quartet, ''Drop after Drop'' reflects the composer's response to the Russian invasion of Ukraine, encapsulating deep pain and memories through its haunting melodies.

== Reception ==
In reviewing Mussorgsky Pictures at an Exhibition, Geoffrey Norris for Gramophone magazine wrote that:

Baryshevskyi dared to be different, and he does so again here. If you prefer your Pictures in bold primary colours, this is not for you, but Baryshevskyi has ideas that penetrate beyond the surface of the canvas to touch facets of emotion that are obviously personal to him and which bring to the exhibition a special perspective. Baryshevskyi's performances of Scriabin that are the most unequivocally impressive.

A review of Shostakovich: Suite for Variety Orchestra; Concerto for Piano, Trumpet & Strings; The Golden Age in Classical Music described: "how the satirical fireworks were always shadowed by a mournful remoteness. And these opposites are nicely balanced here under Antonii Baryshevskyi's volatile fingers and Howard Griffiths's crisp direction."

== Recordings ==
Discography
Year	Title	Other artists	Note
2010	Piano recital. Scarlatti, Ravel, Debussy, Rachmaninov, Stravinsky, Mateos		
2015	Mussorgsky & Scriabin		
2017	Six piano sonatas by Galina Ustvolskaya		
2018	Hymne au Soleil. Lili Boulanger	Orpheus Vokalensemble; Michael Alber, conductor	Choral Works
2018	Shostakovich: Suite for Variety Orchestra; Concerto for Piano, Trumpet & Strings; The Golden Age	Romain Leleu, Brandenburgisches Staatsorchester Frankfurt; Howard Griffiths, conductor	
2019	Frédéric Chopin selected piano works – 24 Preludes Op. 28; 5 Mazurkas; Scherzo No. 2 Op. 31		Issued with No. 353, April 2019, of Amadeus magazine
2020	O schöne Nacht. Romantische Chormusik	Orpheus Vokalensemble; Michael Alber, conductor	Choral Works
2021	Lunyov & Retinsky		Piano works of contemporary classical composers Svyatoslav Lunyov and Alexey Retinsky. Golka label
2024	Hugo Wolf Mörikelieder	Jan Willem Baljet, baritone	
2025	TO ALL ALIVE		Piano music by Maxim Shalygin. Blukanya label

== Awards. Music festivals and competition ==
In 2020 he became a laureate of Levko Revutsky award for the creation, stage and concert embodiment of outstanding musical works that have gained wide public recognition. Baryshevskyi has appeared at numerous International Music Festivals and has claimed top prizes in Ukraine, Israel, Italy and Spain:

- 2005 – Second prize and special prize of European Union of Music Competitions at the International Competition for Young Pianists in Memory of Vladimir Horowitz
- 2008 – First prize, audience prize and 3 special prizes at the Isidor Bajic Piano Memorial Competition (Serbia)
- 2009 – First prize, audience prize at the 51th Premio Jaén (Spain)
- 2011 – Third prize at the First International Piano Competition in Paterna (Spain)
- 2011 – Second prize at the 58th Ferruccio Busoni International Piano Competition (Bolzano, Italy)
- 2012 – Second prize and audience prize at the "Grand-prix animat" (Paris, France)
- 2013 – Grand-prix 13 International Music Competition in Marocco (Casablanca, Marocco)
- 2013 – Second prize, European Piano Nights Competition in Luxembourg
- 2014 – First prize, golden medal and special prize for best performance of commissioned piece XIV Arthur Rubinstein International Piano Master Competition (Tel Aviv, Israel)

Music festivals in which he has appeared include:

- Klavier-Festival Ruhr (Germany 2012, 2014)
- Projetto Martha Argerich (Lugano, Switzerland, 2014),
- Busoni festival (Bolzano, Italy, 2012),
- Musica Insieme Fondazione (Bologna, 2017; Varignan, 2018),
- MDR Musicsommer Festival (Eisenach, Germany, 2015)
- Bartolomeo Cristofori festival (Padova, Italy, 2018)
- Kyiv Bouquet Stage (Ukraine 2018, 2019, 2020) (Oxford 2022)
- Odessa Classics (Odesa, Ukraine, 2019, 2021)
- Gaudeamus (Utrecht, Netherlands, 2022)
- Eufonie festival (Warzaw, Poland, 2022)
- Copenhagen Summer Festival (Denmark, 2015, 2023)
- WoNDeRFeeL festival with project "Delirium" (Netherlands, 2023)
- Brusseles Piano Festival (Belgium, 2023)
- Minimal Music Festival (Muziekgebouw, Amsterdam, Netherlands 2023)
- Muze van Zuid (Amsterdam, Netherlands 2023)
- Winteravonden aan de Amstel (Amsterdam, Netherlands 2023, 2024)
