= Maxim Shalygin =

Ukrainian-Dutch composer, conductor and performer

Maxim Shalygin Максим Шалигін
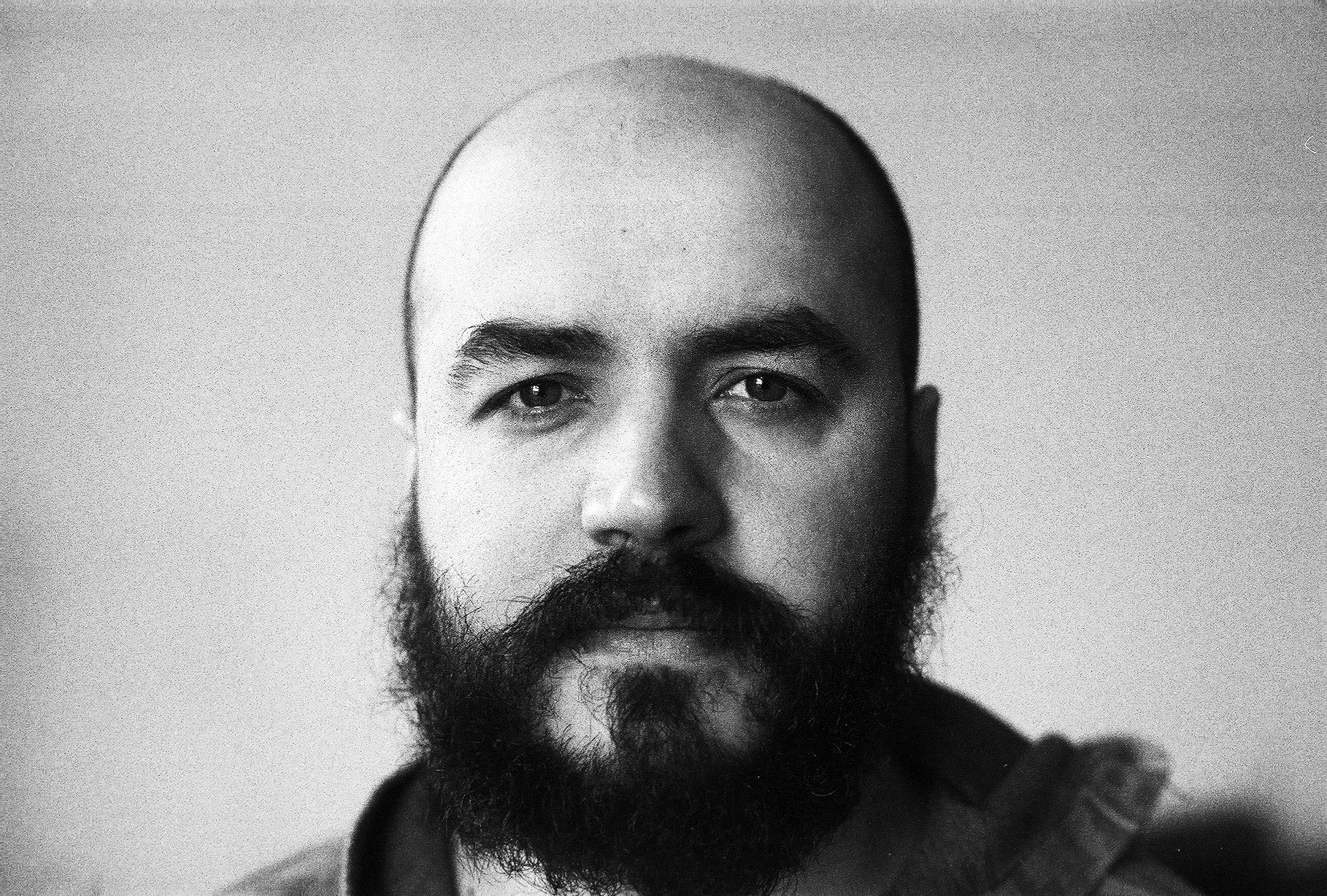

Background information
- Born: January 30, 1985 (age 41); Kamianske, Ukraine
- Genre: Contemporary classical
- Occupations: Composer, conductor, performer
- Years active: 2001–present
- Website: maximshalygin.com

Maxim Shalygin (born January 30, 1985) is a Ukrainian–Dutch composer, conductor, and performer known for his innovative compositions that blend a wide range of techniques.

== Early life and education ==
Shalygin began studying composition at the age of sixteen with Iryna Ivashenko in his hometown of Kamianske (then Dniprodzerzhynsk). In 2004, he studied for one year with Boris Tishchenko at the N. A. Rimsky-Korsakov Saint Petersburg State Conservatory. He received his first master's degree in 2010 from the Ukrainian National Academy of Music in Kyiv, where he studied under Ihor Shcherbakov and was influenced by composer Svyatoslav Lunyov. In 2011, he completed a second master's degree at the Royal Conservatory of The Hague, studying with Cornelis de Bondt and Diderik Wagenaar.

== Career ==
Shalygin moved to the Netherlands in 2010. Since then, he has composed more than 40 works in genres including chamber music, vocal music, orchestral music, electroacoustic music, and music for theatre, ballet, opera, and film. His work has been described as combining extended instrumental techniques with a tonal musical language while avoiding avant-garde radicalism.

His compositions have been performed at international festivals and venues, including Gaudeamus Muziekweek in the Netherlands and Klarafestival in Belgium. They have been performed by ensembles including Asko/Schönberg, Amsterdam Sinfonietta, and Slagwerk Den Haag, as well as by soloists including Antonii Baryshevskyi, Anna Fedorova, Maya Fridman, Natalia Gordeyeva, Tomoko Mukaiyama, Emmy Storms, and Diana Tishchenko.

== Music ==
=== Works ===
Shalygin has composed music for dance productions in collaboration with Dutch choreographer Lonneke van Leth. Their joint projects include De Odyssee (2014), a large-scale dance production based on the Greek myth of Odysseus, created by van Leth and visual artist Vincent de Kooker. The production featured a cast of professional and amateur performers, musicians from the Asko/Schönberg ensemble and members of the Rosa Ensemble. Shalygin was commissioned to compose its music after the Metropole Orkest was unable to participate. Another collaboration was De Zaak Carmen (2017–2018), a dance production created with writer Martijn de Rijk and performed by the New European Ensemble together with approximately thirty professional and amateur dancers on tour in the Netherlands.

In 2016, Shalygin founded the Shapeshift Ensemble in the Netherlands and initiated the S I M I L A R project, a multi-part cycle of works written for different instrumental ensembles. Each chapter is scored for a specific combination of instruments.

To date, the project includes:

1. Lacrimosa or 13 Magic Songs (2017) – for seven violins. The first chapter of the cycle, written for seven violinists.
2. Todos los fuegos el fuego (2019) – for eight saxophones. A cycle for saxophone octet inspired by the relationship between music and literature.
3. Severade (2021) – for nine cellos.
4. Delirium (2023) – for four grand pianos.
5. Bleeding (2024) – for thirteen brass players. The work reinterprets material from Anton Bruckner's Symphony No. 8 in a contemporary musical context.

Amandante is Shalygin's first opera. It premiered on 2 October 2024 at the Muziekgebouw aan 't IJ in Amsterdam. Inspired by Plato's Symposium, the opera explores themes of love and desire. Reviews in the Dutch press were mixed. NRC praised its "masterful dramaturgy" and "triumph of musical imagination", describing the performance as a "rollercoaster of emotions". de Volkskrant described the opera as a "pompous potpourri of over-familiar musical styles" and considered the scenes disjointed. Theaterkrant compared the music to "a kind of Philip Glass in overdrive", noting its repetitive motifs and climactic structure. The production was performed by the Ukrainian ensemble Nova Opera and incorporated visual elements, including Edith Dekyndt's video work Ombre indigène.

Fetus Études is a cycle of piano études:

- Au vent sur la pointe des pieds (2019)
- Angel (2020)
- To All Alive (2023)
- To All in Love (2024)
- To All Resurrected (2024)

=== Other notable works ===
- Letters to Anna (2009–2010), a symphony for solo violin, received an honourable mention at the 2012 Gaudeamus competition.
- Canti d'inizio e fine (2019), written for a solo performer who plays, sings, and acts, has been performed by cellist Maya Fridman.
- Kaya (2019) for violin and piano was commissioned by the Oskar Back Vioolconcours and dedicated to the composer's daughter, Kaya Shalygin. It was performed by Diana Tishchenko and José Gallardo during their ECHO Rising Stars tour.
- Angel (2020) for violin and cello premiered in performances by Maya Fridman and Merel Vercammen.
- Drop after Drop (2022), a string quartet commissioned by Festivals for Compassion, was composed in response to the Russian invasion of Ukraine. It was performed by the Riot Ensemble at the Huddersfield Contemporary Music Festival in the United Kingdom. An arrangement for piano four hands was performed by pianists Anna Fedorova and Antonii Baryshevskyi as an encore during the Concert for Ukraine at the De Doelen in Rotterdam on 13 January 2024.
- Diana (2022) was dedicated to violinist Diana Tishchenko.

=== Discography ===
The following list consists of studio albums of compositions by Maxim Shalygin.

| Year | Title | Other artists | Notes / Accolades |
|---|---|---|---|
| 2012 | When Everything Ends, We Start to Sing Our Songs | | |
| 2018 | Shalygin: Lacrimosa or 13 Magic Songs | Shapeshift Ensemble | |
| 2018 | Shalygin: Blessing | Babylon Quartet, Georgi Sztojanov | Single |
| 2019 | Shalygin: Canti d'inizio e fine | Maya Fridman | #33 best album of 2019 (De Volkskrant) |
| 2019 | Shalygin: Todos Los Fuegos El Fuego | Amstel Quartet, Keuris Quartet | |
| 2020 | Maze of Pleasures | | |
| 2022 | Satarsa | | EP |
| 2022 | Maxim Shalygin: Six Bagatelles & Suite-Homage to Alfred Schnittke | Ihor Zavhorodnii, Andrii Pavlov, Irina Kozlova, Sergey Kozakov, Igor Patsovsky | |
| 2025 | Maxim Shalygin: TO ALL ALIVE | Antonii Baryshevskyi – piano | Contains 9 Preludes (2004) and Fetus Études (2019–2024) |

== Recent activities ==
As of 2024, Shalygin continues to reside and work in the Netherlands, actively composing and participating in various musical projects and festivals worldwide.
