= Aleksey Semenenko =

Ukrainian and German classical violinist

- Born: 1988 (age 37–38); Odesa, Ukrainian Soviet Socialist Republic, Soviet Union (now Ukraine)
- Education: Hochschule für Musik und Tanz Köln
- Occupations: Classical violinist; Academic teacher
- Organizations: Folkwang University of the Arts
- Website: www.aleksey-semenenko.com

Aleksey Semenenko (Ukrainian: Олексій Семененко, romanized: Oleksiy Semenenko; born 1988) is a Ukrainian and German classical violinist. He won second prize at the Queen Elisabeth Competition in Brussels in 2015, and has performed in Europe and the U.S. as a soloist and chamber musician. He has been teaching at the Folkwang University of the Arts in Germany's Ruhr Area.

== Career ==
Semenenko was born in Odesa. He studied violin and chamber music, first in Ukraine, then at the Hochschule für Musik und Tanz Köln with Zakhar Bron and Harald Schoneweg, graduating with the concert exam. He won the Young Concert Artists Auditions in New York City in 2012, and second prize at the Queen Elisabeth Competition in Brussels in 2015 which won him international recognition. He has performed at Wigmore Hall in London, the Berliner Philharmonie, Seattle's Benaroya Hall, Washington's Kennedy Center, the Kölner Philharmonie, the Centre for Fine Arts in Brussels, Alice Tully Hall in New York City, the Philharmonie in Moscow, and the Concertgebouw in Amsterdam.

Semenenko plays in a duo with his wife, pianist Inna Firsova. He founded the Stolyarsky Quartet, playing in France, Malta, Russia, Switzerland and Ukraine. He became a German citizen, and since 2021 has been teaching violin at the Folkwang University of the Arts.

Semenenko, a holder of both German and Ukrainian passports, played a concert in Kyiv on 23 February 2022, the day before the Russian invasion of Ukraine. Because he had entered the country with his Ukrainian passport, he was prevented from leaving the country after the invasion because he was "able-bodied". He made it as far as Lviv by train; there he played a charity video concert on 23 March 2022, together with pianist Antonii Baryshevskyi and others, to help colleagues who were bombed out. He also played at the music school for students and their parents. His wife submitted his German passport, and after four weeks, he and seven other musicians were permitted to leave the country.

He was soloist in a series of concerts in Germany of the Kyiv Symphony Orchestra. Conducted by Luigi Gaggero, the program focused on music by Ukrainian composers, combining Berezovsky's Symphony in C major with Chausson's Poème, Skoryk's Melody in A minor (1982) and Lyatoshynsky's Symphony No. 3, Op. 50 (1951), with a program "Peace will conquer war" in the last movement. Semenenko gave the Poème the contours and the intensity of existential questioning ("die Konturen und die Intensität existenziellen Fragens"), according to FAZ reviewer Doris Kösterke. After the solo in the Melody, he played for an encore a Serenade for violin solo by Valentyn Silvestrov, with at times an extreme mesmerising pianissimo ("bis zu einem extremen, in höchstem Maße magnetischen Pianissimo").

He and Baryshevskyi accompanied the National Symphony Orchestra of Ukraine's tour of the United Kingdom in October 2023 as alternating soloists.
