= Kyiv Symphony Orchestra =

Ukrainian symphony orchestra

- Orchestra
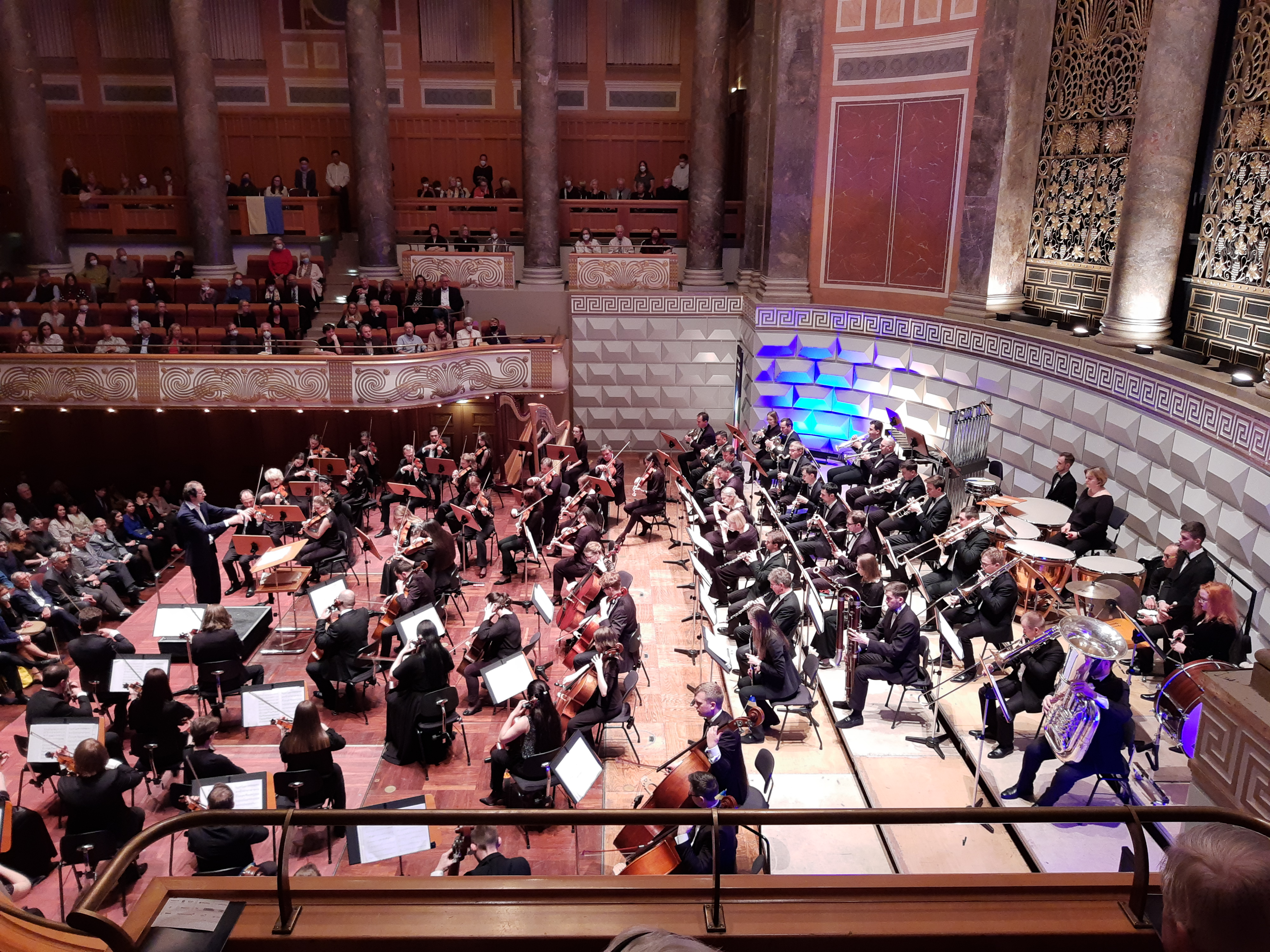
- The orchestra playing at the Kurhaus Wiesbaden on 28 April 2022
- Founded: 1980s
- Location: Kyiv, Ukraine
- Principal conductor: Luigi Gaggero
- Website: kyivsymphony.com/en/

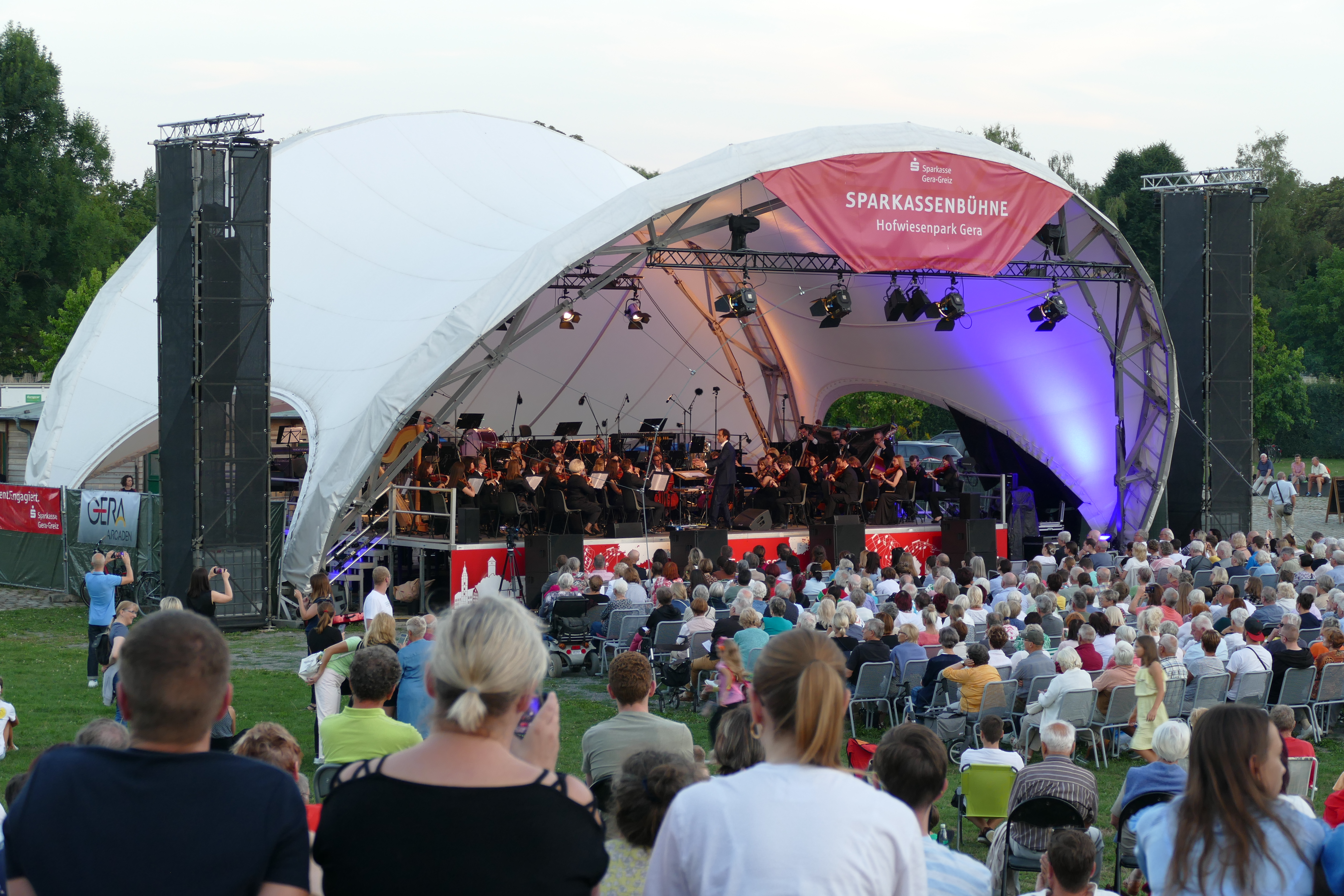
In 2022, the Kyiv Symphony Orchestra performed on Ukraine's National Day as part of an open-air concert in Gera's Hofwiesenpark - a thank-you for hospitality and generosity.

The Kyiv Symphony Orchestra (Ukrainian: Київський симфонічний оркестр, romanized: Kyivskyi symfonichnyi orkestr) is a Ukrainian symphony orchestra based in Kyiv, Ukraine. It has been conducted by Luigi Gaggero since 2018. The orchestra played music by Ukrainian composers on a tour to major concert halls in Poland and Germany, beginning in April 2022.

== History ==
The Kyiv Symphony Orchestra was founded in 1979, during the time of the Ukrainian Soviet Socialist Republic. It was previously known as the Kyiv Fantastic Orchestra and the State Academic Variety Symphony Orchestra of Ukraine.

From 2005 to 2018, the artistic director of the State Symphony Orchestra of Ukraine was Mykola Lysenko, great-great-grandson of famous Ukrainian composer. In 2017, the orchestra director was changed — Oleksandr Zaitsev was appointed instead of Serhii Fedorenko. The latter, in turn, fired the artistic director, Mykola Lysenko, and invited Bohdan Pushchak, a native of Donetsk, to replace him. The orchestra received an unofficial name Kyiv Fantastic orchestra.

Since 2018 the chief conductor has been Luigi Gaggero. He came to Ukraine as a performing percussionist around 2012, and was impressed by the quiet attention of the audience, listening like to a spiritual message ("geistige Botschaft"). Gaggero was born in Italy, studied in Germany, has taught in France, and has a vision of building Europe. The orchestra has toured in Spain and the Netherlands. They have played at national occasions, such as the 30th anniversary of independence in 2021. The orchestra has run an orchestra academy.

During the 2022 Russian invasion of Ukraine, the orchestra was invited to play a series of concerts in Poland and Germany, beginning with a concert in Warsaw on 21 April. The tour was approved not only by the Ministry of Culture, but also the Ministry of Defense, permitting male players to leave the country. They have performed in Germany at the Kulturpalast in Dresden, Leipzig, the Berliner Philharmonie, the Kurhaus Wiesbaden as part of the Rheingau Musik Festival, Freiburg, the Kuppelsaal of the Stadthalle Hannover, the Elbphilharmonie in Hamburg and the Hofwiesenpark in Gera. The performers were allowed to be accompanied by their families and children.

The program of the tour is focused on Ukrainian music, with works by Maxim Berezovsky, Myroslav Skoryk and Borys Lyatoshynsky. The program for Wiesbaden combined Berezovsky's Symphony in C major from the 1770s with Chausson's Poème for violin and orchestra, Op. 25, and Skoryk's Melody in A minor (1982). The violinist there was Aleksey Semenenko. The program ended with Lyatoshynsky's Symphony No. 3, Op. 50 (1951) in its original form, with the final movement themed: "Peace will conquer war."
