= Luigi Gaggero =

Italian conductor and percussionist (born 1976)

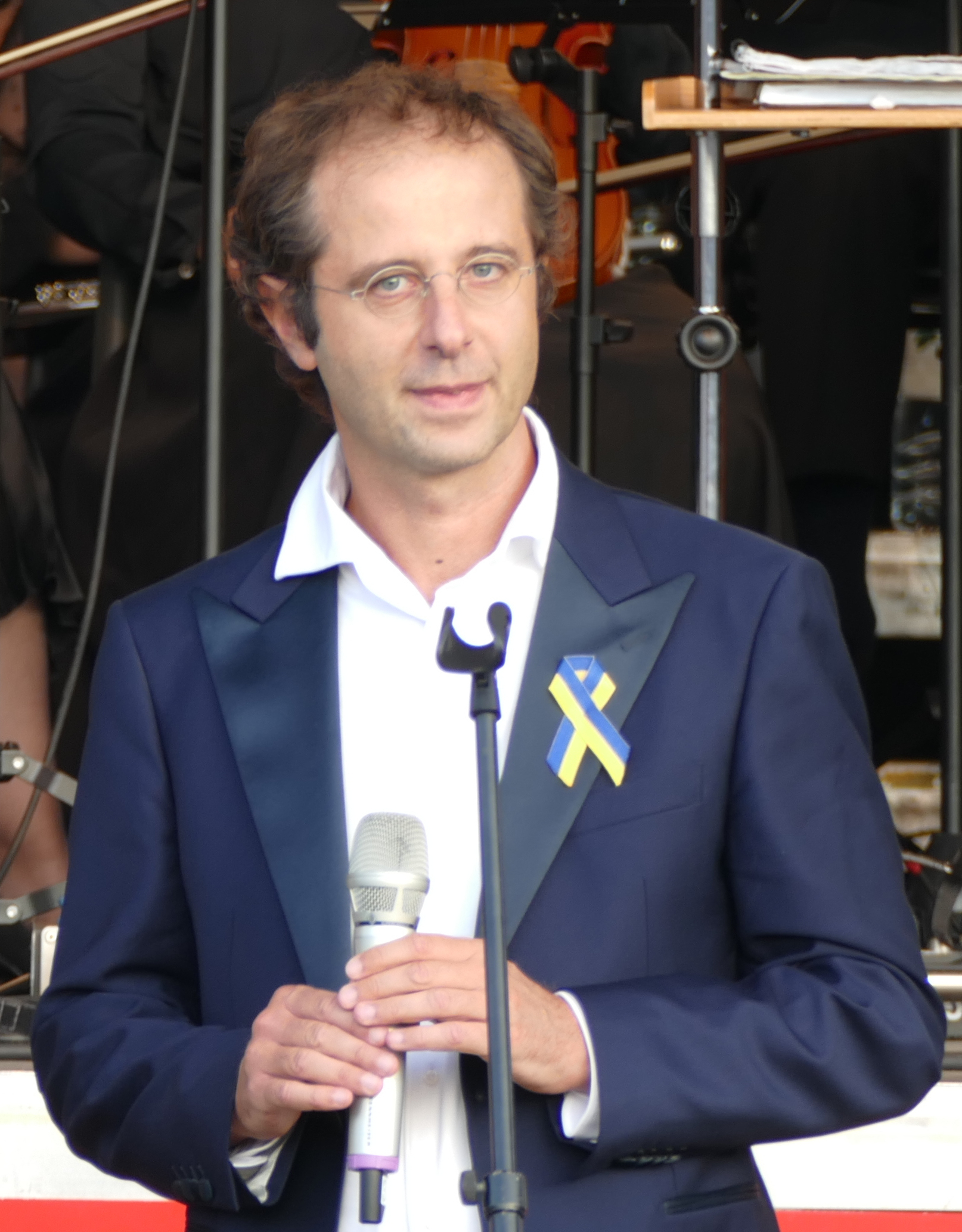
- Gaggero in Gera in 2022
- Born: 1976 (age 49–50); Genoa, Italy
- Occupations: Conductor; Classical percussionist; Academic teacher
- Organizations: Ukho Ensemble Kyiv; Conservatoire de Strasbourg; Kyiv Symphony Orchestra
- Website: luigigaggero.com

Luigi Gaggero (born 1976) is an Italian conductor, percussionist and academic teacher who has worked internationally. He is the chief conductor of the Kyiv Symphony Orchestra, and cimbalon teacher at the Conservatoire de Strasbourg, the only professor of cimbalon in Western Europe.

== History ==
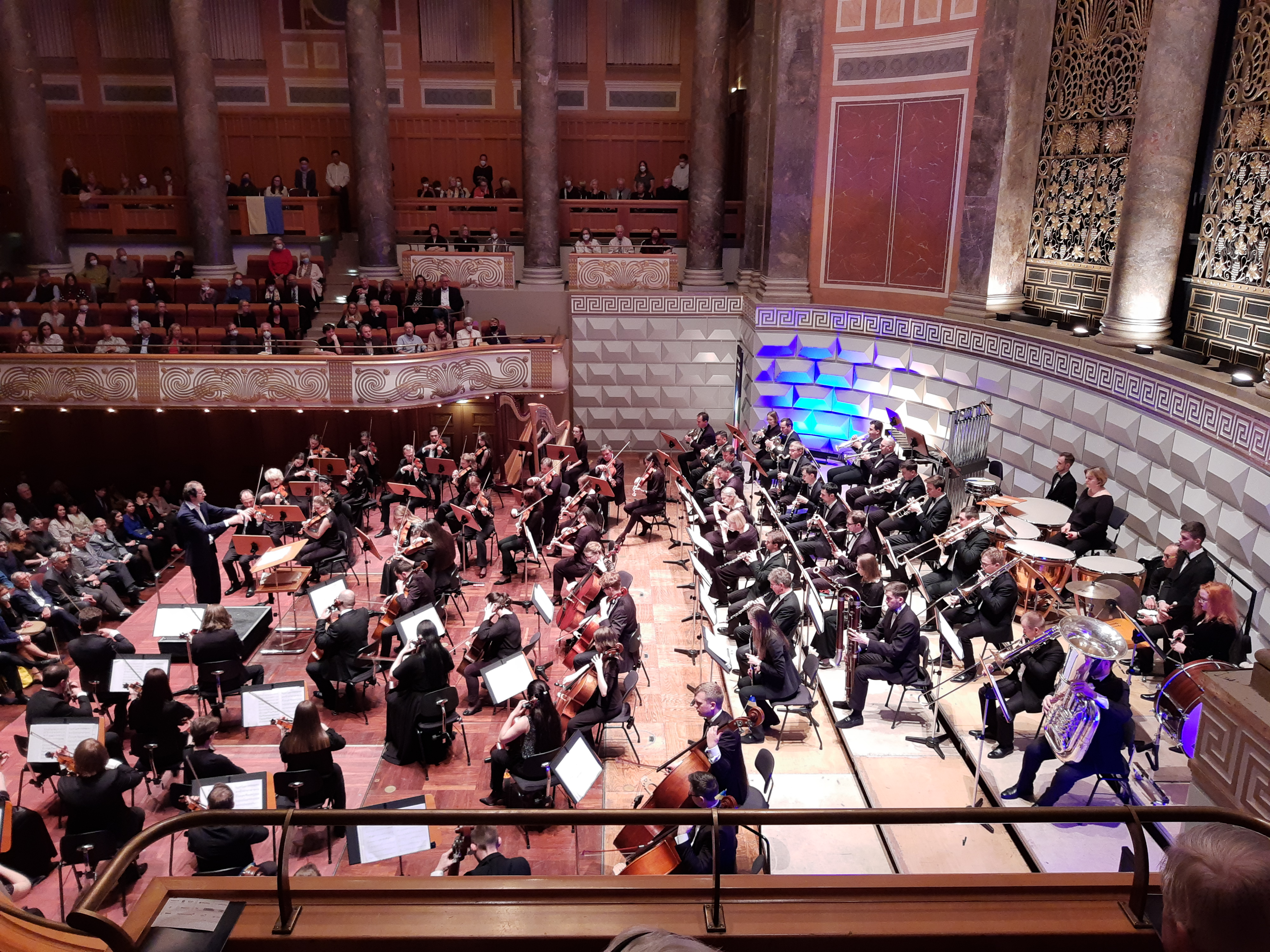
Gaggero conducting the Kyiv Symphony Orchestra at the Kurhaus Wiesbaden on 28 April 2022

Gaggero was born in Italy. He studied percussion and conducting with Andrea Pestalozza, cimbalon with Márta Fábián in Budapest. He studied percussion further with Edgar Guggeis and Rainer Seegers at the Hochschule für Musik Hanns Eisler Berlin, where he graduated a solo diploma with distinction. He came to Ukraine as a performing percussionist around 2012, and was impressed by the quiet attention of the audience, listening like to a spiritual message ("geistige Botschaft"). He co-founded and directed the Ukho Ensemble Kyiv for contemporary music in 2015. He has taught cimbalon and percussion at the Conservatoire de Strasbourg, as the only full professor of cimbalon in Western Europe.

Gaggero became chief conductor of the Kyiv Symphony Orchestra in 2018. During the 2022 Russian invasion of Ukraine, the orchestra was invited to play a series of concerts in Poland and Germany, beginning with a concert in Warsaw on 21 April. They have performed in Germany at the Kulturpalast in Dresden, Leipzig, the Berliner Philharmonie, the Kurhaus Wiesbaden as part of the Rheingau Musik Festival, Freiburg, the Kuppelsaal of the Stadthalle Hannover, and the Elbphilharmonie in Hamburg. The program of the tour is focused on Ukrainian music, with works by Maxim Berezovsky, Myroslav Skoryk and Borys Lyatoshynsky. The program for Wiesbaden combined Berezovsky's Symphony in C major from the 1770s with Chausson's Poème for violin and orchestra, Op. 25, Skoryk's Melody in A minor (1982) and Lyatoshynsky's Symphony No. 3, Op. 50 (1951). The symphony's last movement, with the theme "Peace will conquer war", had to be reworked and the theme removed under the Soviet regime in the 1950s. The concerts restored the music to the original version from 1951. The violinist was Aleksey Semenenko.

The orchestra remained in Germany in exile, in Gera. On 24 August 2022, Ukraine's National Day, Gaggero conducted them as part of an open-air concert in Gera's Hofwiesenpark.
