= Alexey Retinsky =

Russian composer

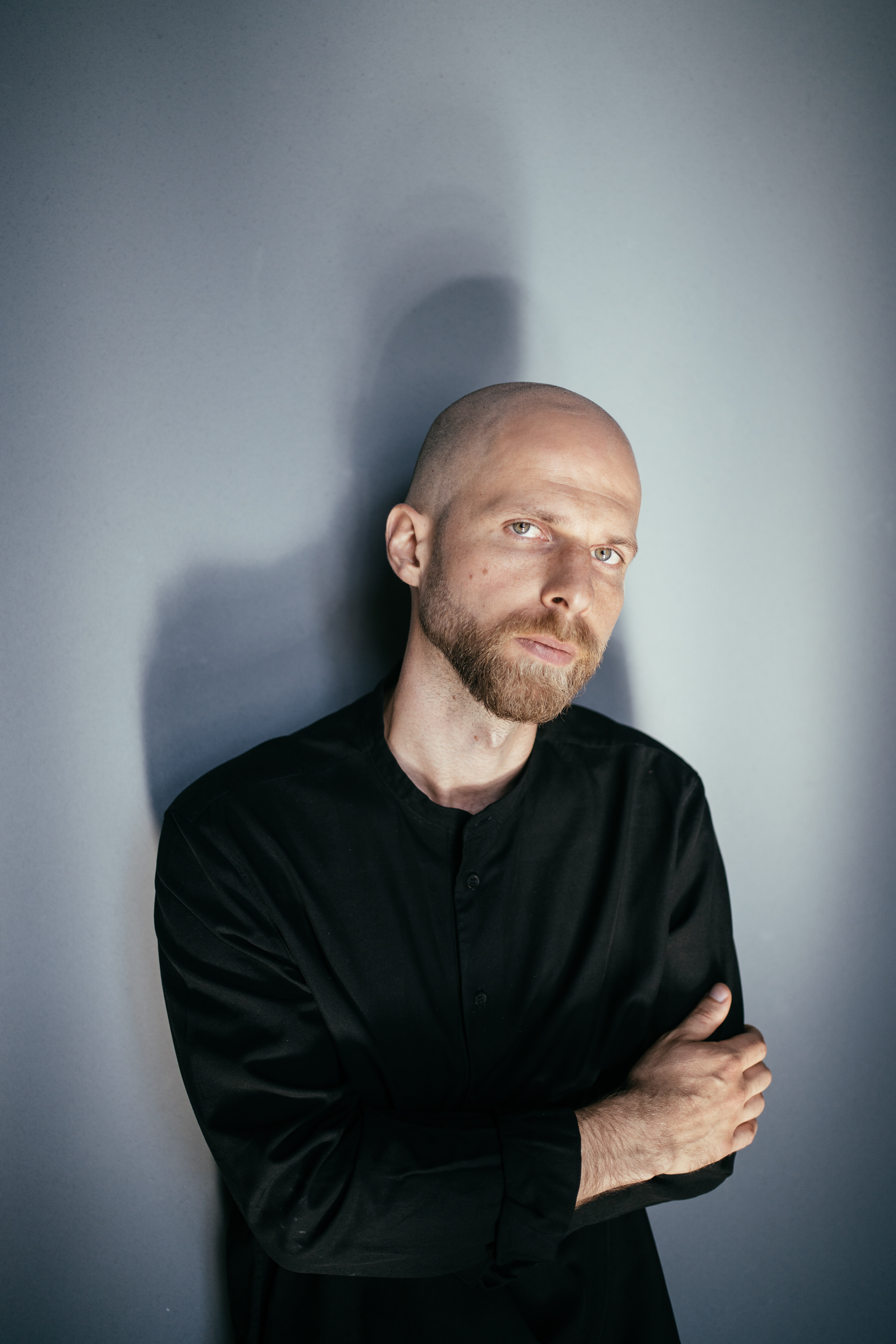
- Alexey Retinsky, 2020

Background information
- Born: November 14, 1986 (age 39); Simferopol, Crimea, the USSR
- Genres: contemporary classical; film score
- Occupation: Composer
- Years active: 2006–present
- Website: retinsky.com

Alexey Retinsky (ukr. Oleksii Retynskii) was born on 14 November 1986 in Simferopol, Crimea. He is an Austrian composer and artist of Russian-Ukrainian origin.

== Biography ==
Born to a family of musicians in Simferopol, Retinsky's early musical experiences consisted of playing wind instruments. He graduated from the School of Music, mastering the oboe, saxophone and trumpet. In parallel, he began to study composition. He later studied composition and electroacoustic composition in Music Academy of Kiev and in the Zurich University of the Arts (Zürcher Hochschule der Künste). His PhD studies were concluded at the University of Music and Performing Arts in Graz by Beat Furrer. Since 2014, he has lived and worked in Vienna.

== Musical development ==
Retinsky's oeuvre is wide; he is a creator of symphonic, chamber and electronic music, as well as music for theatre, installation and performance art. His music works and various projects have been performed in Mariinsky Theater, National Philharmonic of Ukraine, MuseumsQuartier in Vienna, Museum Joaneum Graz, Dresdner Zwinger, Gaudeamus Muziekweek (NL), by the Festivals CIME/ICEM Denton (USA), MDR Muisiksommer Eisenach and many others. In common with the studio Idee und Klang, he created electroacoustic music for the Swiss National Museum in Zurich, the Imperial War Museum in London, the King Abdulaziz Center for World Culture in Saudi Arabia.

In addition to his work as a composer and musician, Rentisky paints and takes film photography.

== Some works ==
=== Music for Orchestra ===
- "Ultima Thule" (Latvian: Last Island) for 23 strings, cymbals and bells (2009)
- Symphony "De profundis" for large symphonic orchestra (2009–2010)

=== Chamber music and ensemble music ===
- Trio for violin, cello and piano (2007)
- "Lament" for violin and piano (2008)
- "Subito" for flute and piano (2008)
- "Shades of white" for two cellos and piano (2010)
- "Dreams of the bird" for violin and piano (2010–2011)
- String Quartet "C-Dur" for two violins, viola and cello (2011)
- "Punctum Nulla" (Lat .: The point of no return) eight-channel tape (2012)
- "Sleeping Music" stereo tape (2012–2013)
- "... and the path was wide" for piano (2012–2013)
- "The World Without Me" Audiovisual installation (2013)
- "Hamlet_Babylon" incidental music for 3 folk-female voices, two cellos, flute and stereo tape (2013)
- Hamlet installation. Stereo tape (2013)
- "Two birds and one sky" for two violins (2014)
