= Svyatoslav Lunyov =

Ukrainian composer

- Святослав Луньов
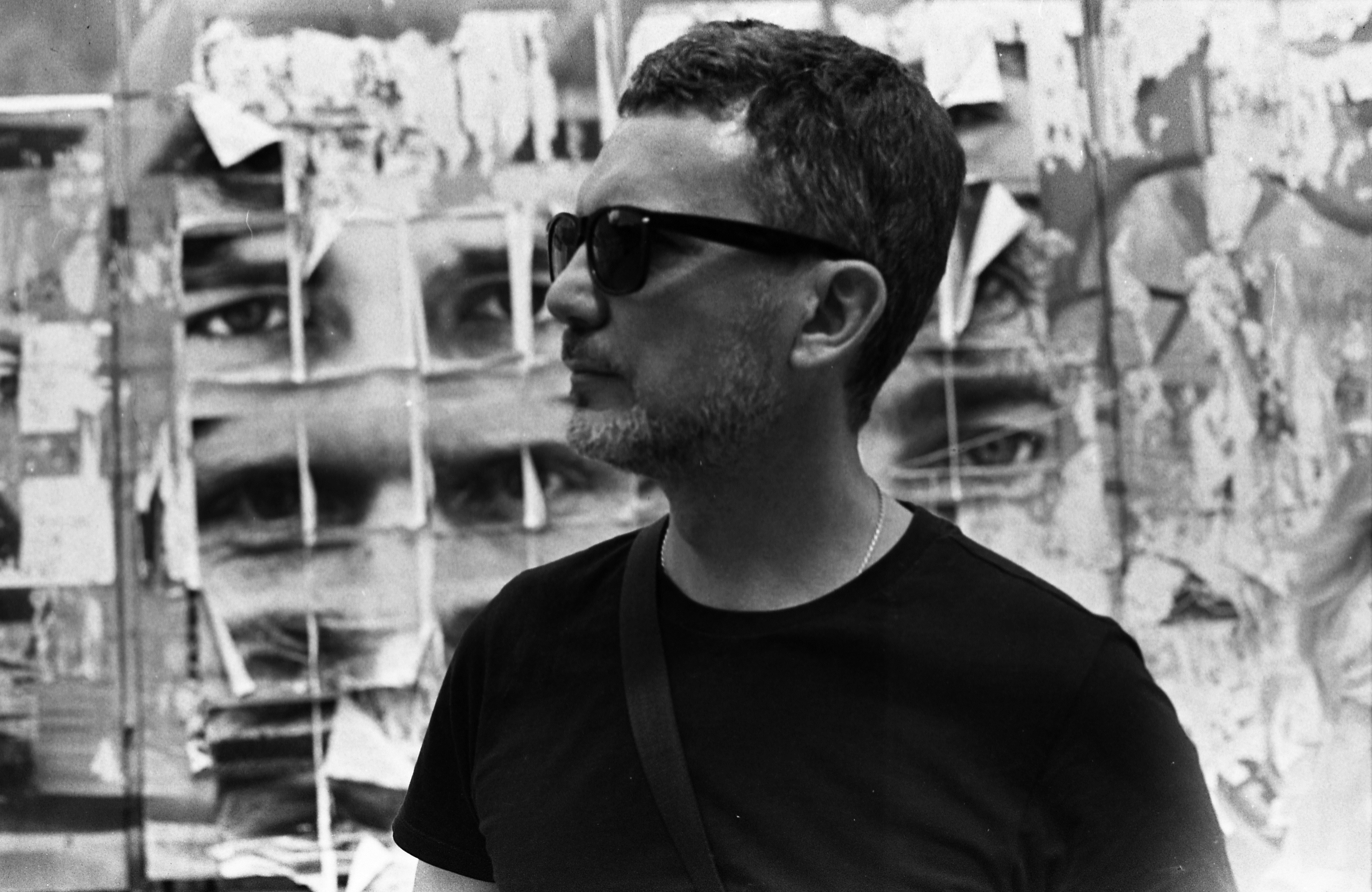
- Born: April 19, 1964 (age 62); Kiev, Ukrainian SSR, Soviet Union
- Occupation: Composer

Svyatoslav Ihorovych Lunyov (Note: Ukrainian: Святослав Ігорович Луньов, romanized: Sviatoslav Ihorovych Lunov) (born April 19, 1964), is a Ukrainian composer. He is the author of symphonic, chamber, choral, piano and electroacoustic music. Among his works are operas ("Moscow - Petushki", "Bad Tempered Songs") and music for movies. In 2017, he received the Bronze Cannes Lion, for Witness. He is member of the National Union of Composers of Ukraine.

He was born in Kyiv and graduated from the Kyiv Conservatory where he studied with Lev Kolodub. Since 2000, he has been a lecturer at the Kyiv Conservatory.

The 2020 Ukrainian Contemporary Music Festival, featured his work New Russian Dances.

One of the most representative compositions is Panta Rhei– a utopia for a big symphony orchestra. This piece – is a hymn to elements of live and non-living nature. In addition to that, it is a look at the idea of the emergence and evolution of life through the idea of detuning an unison. Panta Rhei consists of three parts and lasts 53 minutes. For his entire career, Lunyov encompassed all genres of serious music, including chamber, choral, vocal, piano, electroacoustic, and film music.

In the last years, Lunyov has explored writing electroacoustic, symphonic, and ensemble works. Also, he works on stage genres and music for films. As a composer and sound artist, he is interested in new sounding and such ways of music lasting and composition forms, where movement and static are combined in a new way. His works are performed not only in concert halls but in art galleries, open-air happenings, and other informal stages.

In 2017 his musical open-air performance Witness, dedicated to the 75th anniversary of the Babyn Yar tragedy, received the Bronze Cannes Lion at the Cannes Lions International Festival of Creativity.

During the full-scale war that began on February 24, 2022, Svyatoslav Lunyov created many new pieces. Among them are electronic POST, and also vocal cycles on Ukrainian poems, and piano cycles as well. And a new large-scale work is about to be finished in the near future.

Among the performers of his compositions: the National Symphony Orchestra (Ukraine), the Camerata Kyiv Chamber Orchestra (Ukraine), “Kyiv” Municipal Choir (Ukraine), the National Culture University Choir (Ukraine), “Ricochet” Contemporary Music Ensemble (Ukraine), the vocal ensemble “Alter Ratio” (Ukraine), “MusikFabrik” Contemporary Music Ensemble (Germany), “Silk Road” Duet (Germany), “Trinity Wall Street Choir” (the USA), “Sinfonietta Sankt Gallen” (Switzerland), and many others. Conductors: Volodymyr Sirenko, Vyacheslav Blinov, Viktor Ploskina, Valery Matyuchin, Volodymyr Runchak (Ukraine), Fedir Gluschenko (Russia), Veronique Laqroix (Canada), Theodore Kuchar (USA), Herman Engels (Belgium), Mikheil Menabde (Georgia/Ukraine), Olga Prykhodko (Ukraine).
