= Anna Fedorova =

Ukrainian musician (born 1990)

Anna Fedorova Анна Бори́сівна Федорова
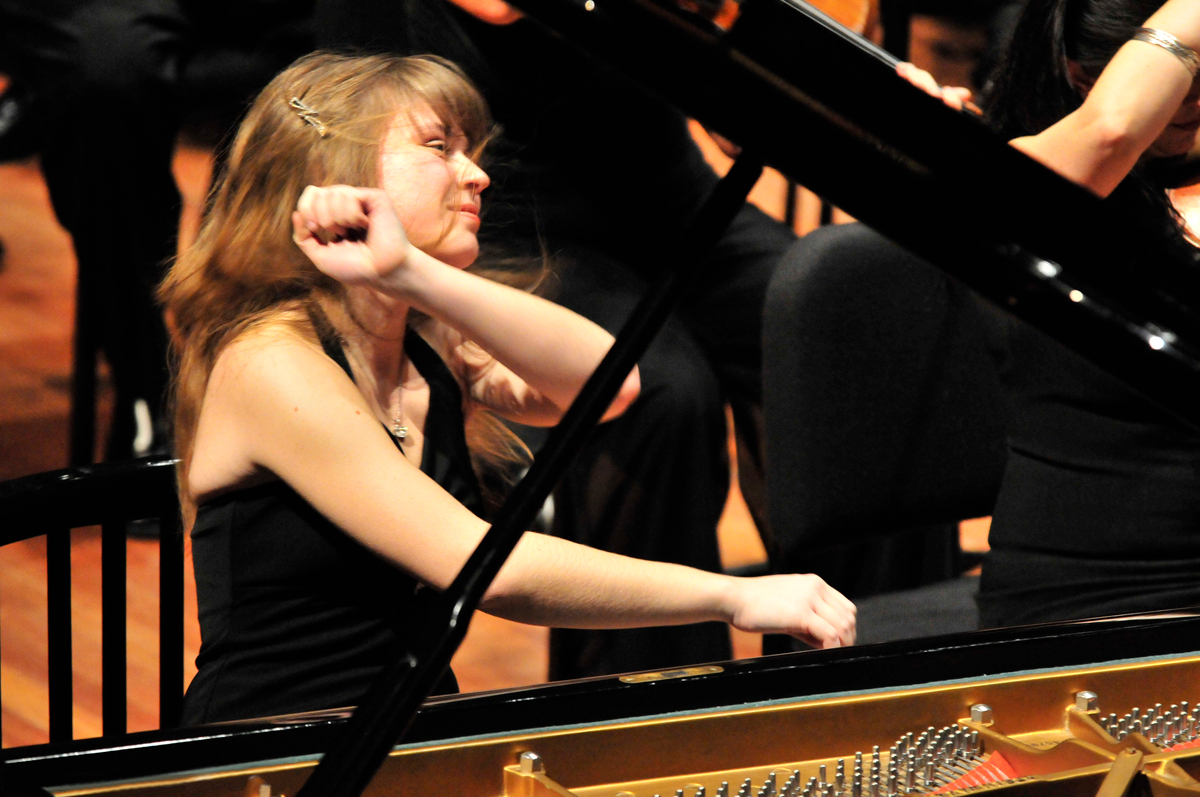
- Anna Fedorova in performance (2008)

Background information
- Born: February 27, 1990 (age 36); Kyiv, Ukrainian Soviet Socialist Republic, Soviet Union
- Genre: Classical music
- Occupation: Musician
- Instrument: Piano
- Years active: 1996–present
- Website: www.annafedorova.com

Anna Borysivna Fedorova (Ukrainian: А́нна Бори́сівна Фе́дорова; born February 27, 1990) is a Ukrainian concert pianist. Fedorova performs as soloist, chamber musician and with symphony orchestras in the major concert halls of Europe, North and South America, and parts of Asia. Fedorova is a David Young Piano Prize Holder supported by a Soirée d'Or Award and Keyboard Trust.

== Early life ==
Fedorova was born in Kyiv, Ukrainian SSR. Both her mother, Tatiana Abayeva, and father, Boris Fedorov, were concert musicians, scholars, and teachers. From the time she was two years old, she had always wanted to become a pianist. She began playing at the age of five. She gave her first public recital when she was six, and she gave her national debut at the age of seven, at the National Philharmonic Society of Ukraine.

Regarding her early childhood, Fedorova has said that, with both parents being professional pianists, there was always "the sound of the piano in the house". Her parents gave her lessons, and she said "they were decisive for my musical development".

== Education ==
In 2008, Fedorova graduated from the Lysenko Musical College for gifted children. As a student, she was the recipient of the president of the Ukraine scholarship during 2003–2008.

Outside her native Ukraine, Fedorova studied under Leonid Margarius at the International Piano Academy, a school of advanced piano performance specialisation located in Imola, Italy.

Fedorova also studied at the Royal College of Music in London under Norma Fisher.

She has also received artistic guidance from world-renowned pianists such as Alfred Brendel, Menahem Pressler, and András Schiff.

== Career ==
Fedorova's "international concert career took off while she was only a child".

In 2013, at the age of twenty-three, Fedorova performed at the Concertgebouw, Amsterdam, Netherlands. She played Rachmaninoff's Piano Concerto No 2. Fedorova has performed there more than thirty times.

Fedorova's manager Rob Groen recounted the first time he heard her play. He "reluctantly" heard her play "as part of a group of piano students performing for him in Kyiv". The first three were "all very good", but, when he heard Anna, he was "in shock" by her "exceptional talent".

Music critics have praised Fedorova's signature "sweet modesty and wild expression", which rendered listeners "completely taken by surprise, compelled and astonished". Fedorova says about her playing, "You can really paint with music. You see the colorful, inspiring scenes."

== Music festivals and competitions ==
Fedorova has appeared at numerous international music festivals and has claimed top prizes in Italy, Greece, Germany, Slovakia, Estonia, and the Czech Republic. The music festivals in which she has appeared are:

- The first International Chamber Music Festival held in the Edesche Concert Hall in Ede, Netherlands. The festival ran from 25 to 28 May 2017. Fedorova was one of the performers as well as the artistic director. Previously, she had often performed in Ede, and she was the artist in residence in the 2015–2016 season. As artistic leader, Fedorova is the central musician of the ICFEde, "a starting intercultural Christian community in the municipality of Ede".
- The Frederick Chopin Competition in Narva, Estonia, in 2004, at which Fedorova won first prize.
- The Institute of Frederick Chopin at the Fourth Moscow International Frederick Chopin Competition for Young Pianists in Moscow. Fedorova won the second prize and a special prize in 2004.
- The International Keyboard Institute & Festival (IKIF) in New York City. In 2006, 2007 and 2008, Fedorova won the Dorothy MacKenzie Artist Recognition Scholarship Award.
- The International Rubinstein 'In Memoriam' piano competition in Bydgoszcz, Poland, in 2009 at which Fedorova won first prize.
- The Lyon Piano Competition in Lyon, France, in 2012 at which Fedorova won a third prize and the Audience Award.
- The Rubinstein Piano Festival in Łódź, Poland. Fedorova took first prize in 2009. In 2011, Fedorova played F. Chopin's Nocturnes, Op. 27; Valse in A-flat major, Op. 42, with the orchestra Polish Camerata, conducted by Marek Glowacki.
- The Tbilisi International Young Pianists Competition in Tbilisi, Georgia, in 2005 where she won first prize and a special prize as Best Pianist in the Competition.
- The Verbier Festival Academy in Switzerland, at which Fedorova became a recipient of the Verbier Festival Academy Award. Fedorova is one of the Academy's Musicians for 2017.

== Recordings ==
- In 2014, Fedorova's first live recital CD was released under the DiscAnnecy label. It contains works by Brahms, Liszt and Chopin.. Also in 2014, Champs Hill Records released a recording of a recital given by Fedorova and Jamal Aliyev. The CD is titled Russian Masters.
- In 2015, Piano Classics released an audio CD of Fedorova playing Rachmaninoff's Piano Concerto No. 2 and Cello Sonata with Benedict Kloeckner as cellist, accompanied by the Nordwestdeutsche Philharmonie.
- In 2015, Disc Auvers released a disc titled Anna Fedorova, Piano: Chopin, Liszt, Brahms with Fedorova playing works by Chopin, Liszt, and Brahms. The disc includes Chopin's Piano Sonata No. 3, Liszt's Années de pèlerinage, Deuxième année: Sonetto del Petrarcha No. 104, and Brahms' Six Piano Pieces, op. 118.

In his review in Fanfare on 10 July 2016, Colin Clarke wrote, "The Chopin Sonata (with exposition repeat) reveals a player of the highest sensitivity... Fedorova has the daring to let bare textures speak for themselves; her rests are always impeccably timed and her approach reminds the listener of the modernity of Chopin's writing." "Brahms seems to enter a whole new world, a fantastical new beginning almost. Fedorova conveys all the exploratory wonder; the end is rapt and magnificent." In the Liszt piece, Fedorova gives "another fine performance". She "seems to enter straight into the world of the composer. Her way with the long tenor/bass melodies expertly tells a story; her filigree is impeccably Lisztian."
In the same issue of Fanfare, Peter J. Rabinowitz had a review. In it he said, "Now just reaching her mid 20s, Ukrainian pianist Anna Fedorova shows herself, on this debut recital, to be a significant pianistic talent." In the Chopin piece, she plays "with a seamless legato, a rich and deep tone, a flexible (even improvisatory) sense of pulse, a sure feel for the emotional weight of the harmonies, and an enviable ability to sustain the phrases, she brings out the long lines in a way that's rare for hotshots of her generation." "She produces instead a polished elegance that helps explain why she did so well in the International Rubinstein In Memoriam competition in Poland in 2009." In the Brahms piece, Fedorova's playing is "even more succulent". "Her treatment of dynamics, especially at the quiet end, draws you in." "This is a distinguished reading—as is her rich and flexible reading of the Liszt Sonnetto."

- In 2016, more albums by Fedorova were released on DRC: Rachmaninov's Piano Concerto No 3 and Mussorgsky's Pictures at an Exhibition were released. Piano Classics released an album of Fedorova playing Rachmaninoff's Piano Concerto No. 2, Cello Sonata accompanied by the Nordwestdeutsche Philharmonic.
