= Kulturpalast =

Concert hall in Dresden, Germany

Coordinates: 51°3′3.6″N 13°44′18.6″E

Kulturpalast Dresden, after the renovation

The Kulturpalast Dresden (lit. 'Palace of Culture') is a modernist building designed by Wolfgang Hänsch during the era of the German Democratic Republic. It was the largest multi-purpose hall in Dresden when it opened in 1969, and was used for concerts, dances, conferences and other events. The building underwent several years of reconstruction beginning in 2012 and opened with a new concert hall in April 2017.

Unlike the other buildings in the Altmarkt square, the Kulturpalast is designed in the unadorned International Style; it is considered a sister building to the now-demolished Palast der Republik in Berlin. It is a stand-alone building with a footprint of around 6,000 square metres (65,000 ft^{2}), faces Wilsdruffer Straße, and forms the second part of the Altmarkt square. Located east of Schloßstraße and southwest of nearby Neumarkt, which has been undergoing a reconstruction project since 2005, it lies in the center of the historic old town, which was largely destroyed during the firebombing of Dresden on 13 February 1945.

== History ==
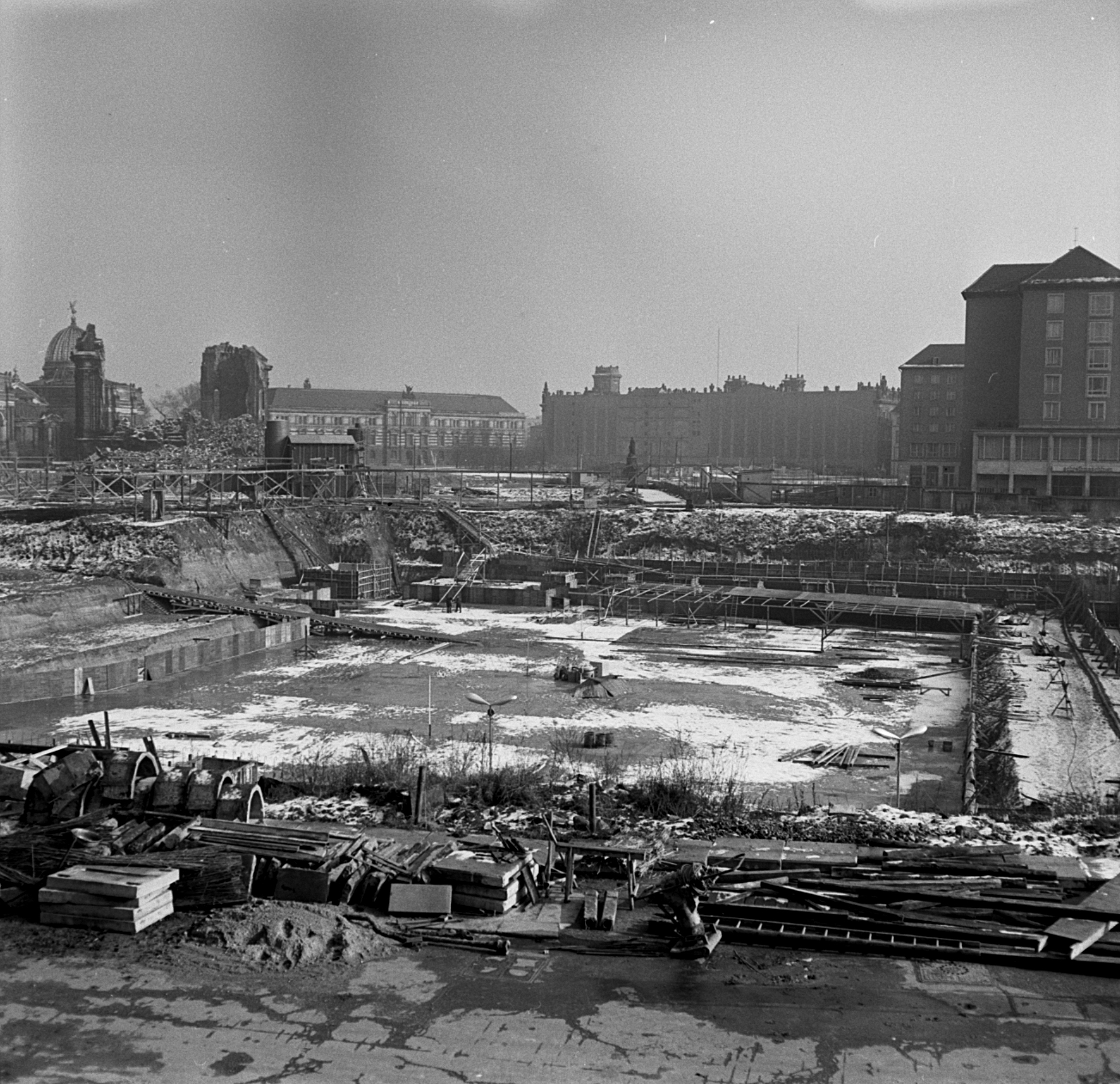
Foundations of the Kulturpalast (1967)

=== Planning and construction ===
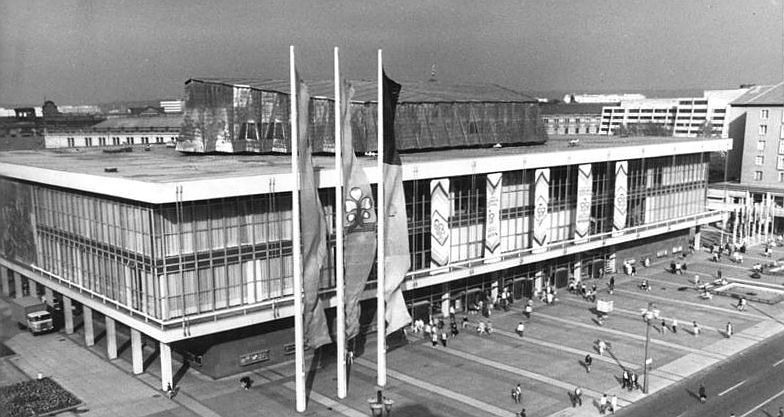
Kulturpalast (1985)

The Kulturpalast was planned as a Socialist Classicist ensemble building. The intention was to erect a high-rise building in the style of the Seven Sisters in Moscow. In 1950, the GDR published The Sixteen Principles of Urban Design, whose important principles included a central square, cityscape-forming high-rise buildings, and wide main roads; the Kulturpalast was intended to fulfill the "dominant high ground" function. This version of the project was never built.

The Kulturpalast was re-designed in the 1960s as the cultural center of the city and district of Dresden. The new design was a two-story cubic building based on plans by Leopold Wiel. There were plans to build a third floor and a grandstand for parades on Ernst-Thälmann-Straße, but this was never done.

=== Refurbishment and renovation ===
Due to improper reconstruction work in the 1990s, it became necessary to renovate the Kulturpalast's fire protection equipment, leading to a five-month closure in the summer of 2007. In the weeks before the renovation, fire engines were stationed next to the building during events.

The building closed for extensive renovations in July 2012. Exterior construction work began in October 2013. The new concert hall, designed by Gerkan, Marg and Partners, reopened in April 2017.

== Building ==
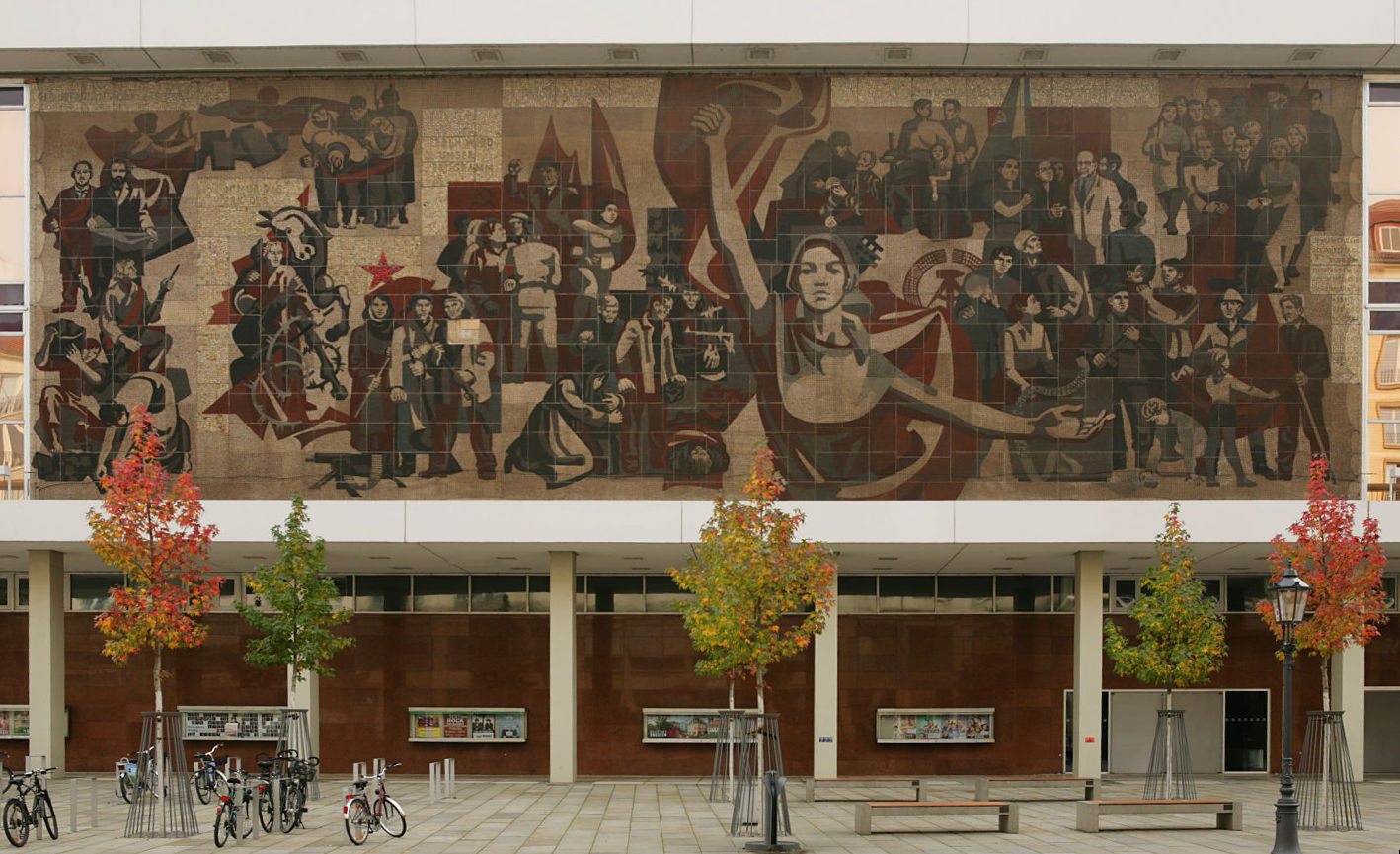
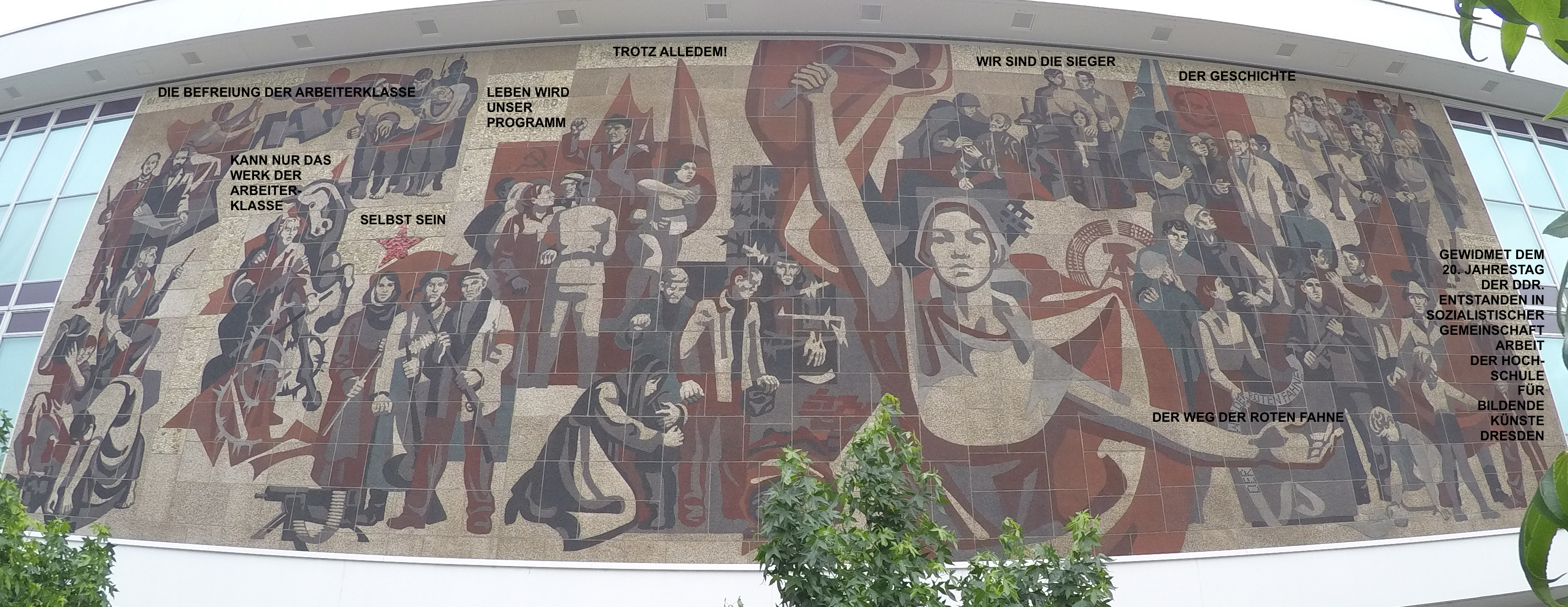
Der Weg der roten Fahne.
Top: mural; bottom: mural with inscriptions highlighted

Due to a special "tilting parquet", the Kulturpalast's original multi-functional ballroom could be used as either a 2435-seat auditorium with rising rows of seats or as a level banquet area. The building also contained a 192-seat studio theatre, classrooms, rehearsal and performance rooms, offices, and a restaurant.

The new concert hall, installed in the 2012–2017 reconstruction, has fewer seats but is designed to better suit its main tenant, the Dresden Philharmonic. As well as the main hall, the building now houses the main branch of the Dresden City Libraries and a performance space used by the cabaret group Die Herkuleskeule.

=== Artwork ===
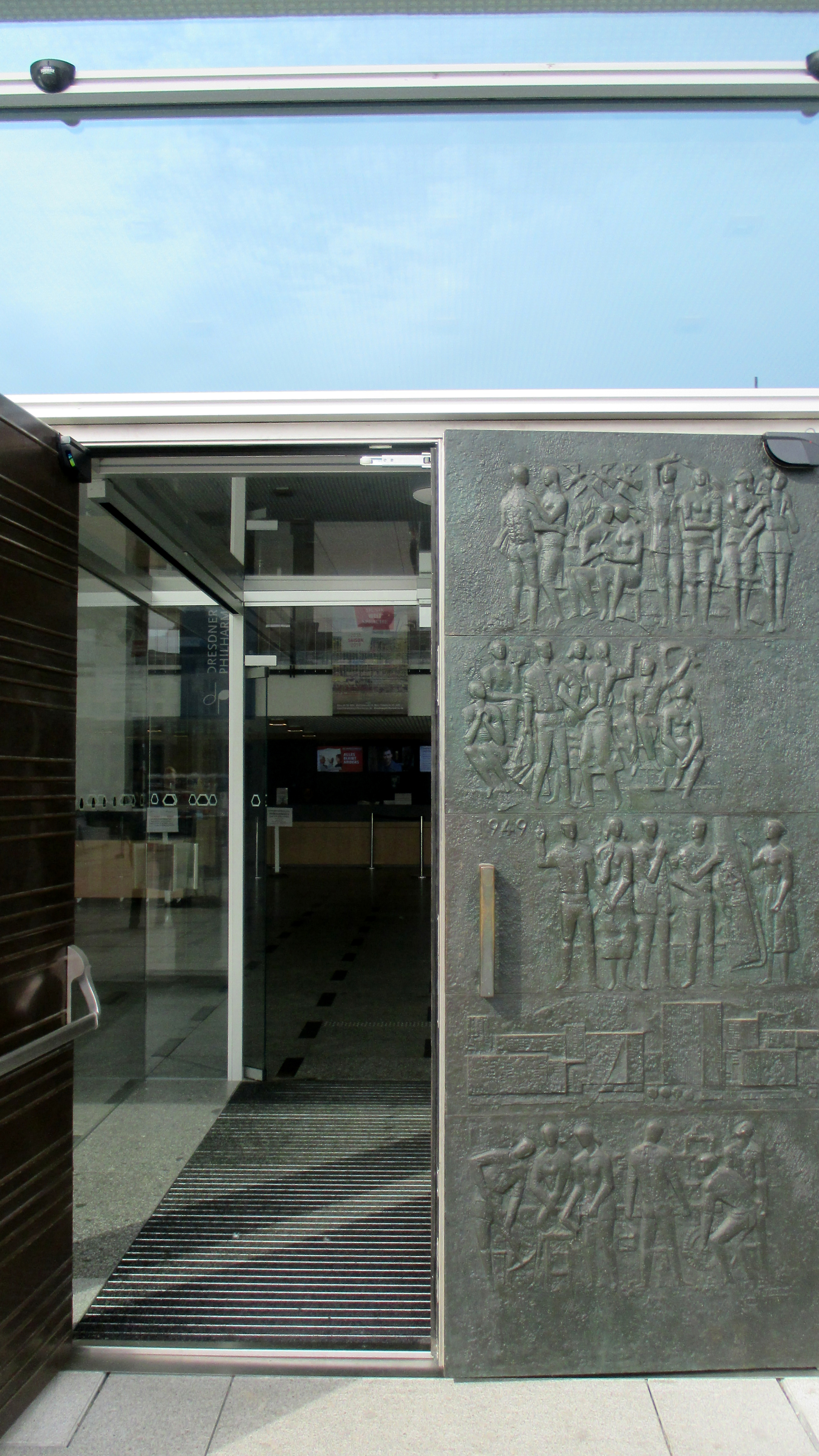
Entrance door after reconstruction

There is a 30-by-10.5-metre (98 ft × 34 ft) mural on the west side of the building, designed by Gerhard Bondzin and created in 1969 by a working group from the Dresden Academy of Fine Arts. The mural, titled Der Weg der roten Fahne (The Way of the Red Flag), is made of concrete slabs electrostatically coated with colored glass. On the first floor is a 45-by-1.9-metre (148 ft × 6 ft) frieze by Heinz Drache and Walter Rehn titled Unser sozialistisches Leben (Our Socialist Life).

The five main entrance doors were designed by Gerd Jaeger in 1969 and represent Dresden's development from a fishing village to a large city. The doors were cast in bronze by Pirner & Franz in Dresden.

When the building first opened it had three water features on the Wilsdruffer Straße side, consisting of terrazzo pools with large fountains in each basin and smaller fountains around the edges. The fountains were removed in the course of construction work for an underground car park at Altmarkt.

=== Organ ===
The inclusion of an organ in state concert hall was not a certainty in the 1960s, as organ music was associated with churches. However, one was installed in 1970 shortly after the building opened. The original organ, built by Jehmlich Orgelbau Dresden, was based on a mobile frame so it could be moved on and off the stage. This mobility limited its size; the organ measured 7.4 by 7.4 by 1.5 metres (24 ft × 24 ft × 5 ft) and had 24 stops over two manuals and pedals. When the Kulturpalast was renovated in 2012, the organ was dismantled and re-installed in St. Mary, Queen of Peace, Church in Cottbus.

A new organ was installed in September 2017. Built by Hermann Eule Orgelbau Bautzen, the new organ is larger than the original: it has 67 stops over four manuals and pedal, and measures 14.7 by 3.3 by 8.5 metres (48 ft × 11 ft × 28 ft).

== Gallery ==
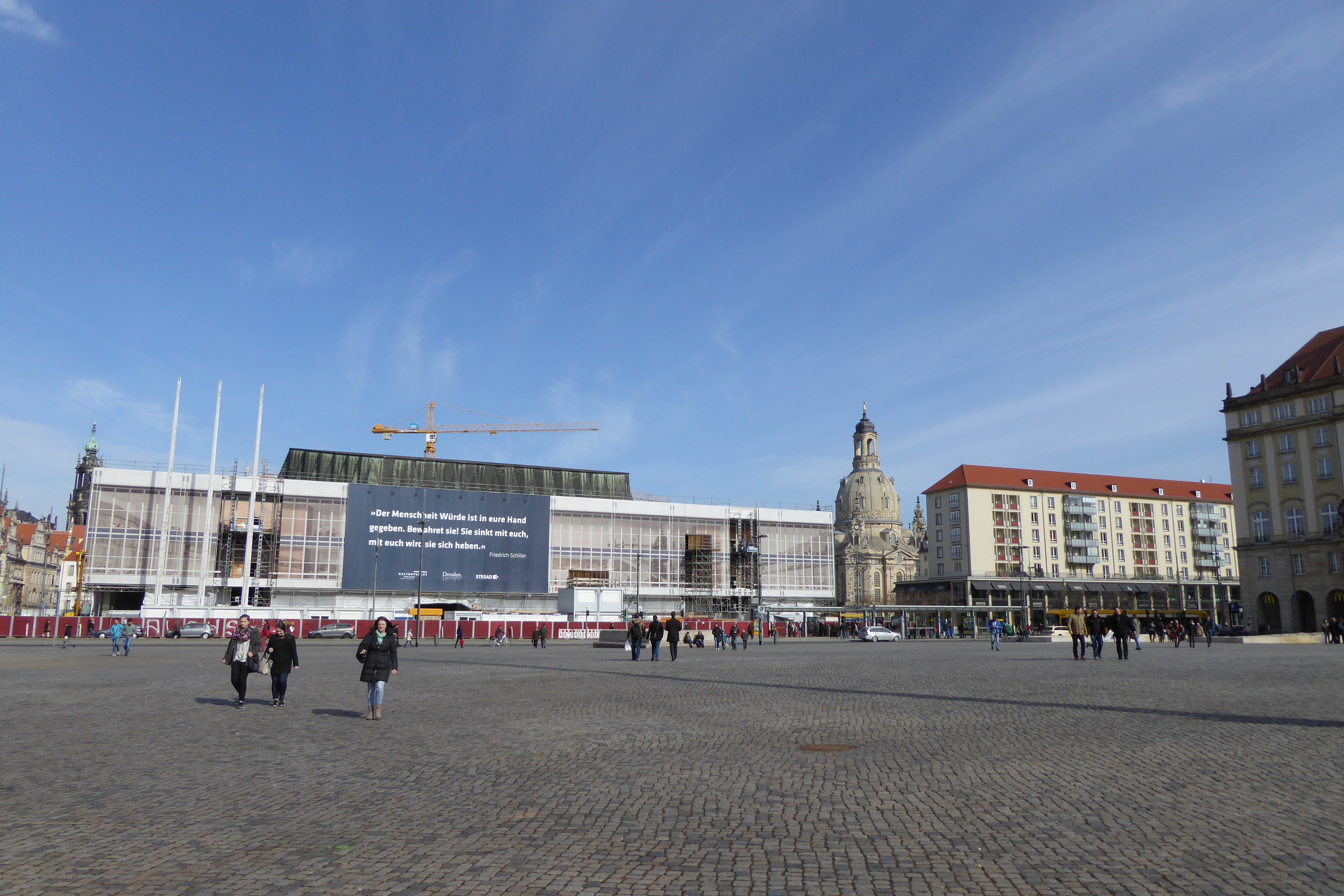
View over the Altmarkt to the Kulturpalast

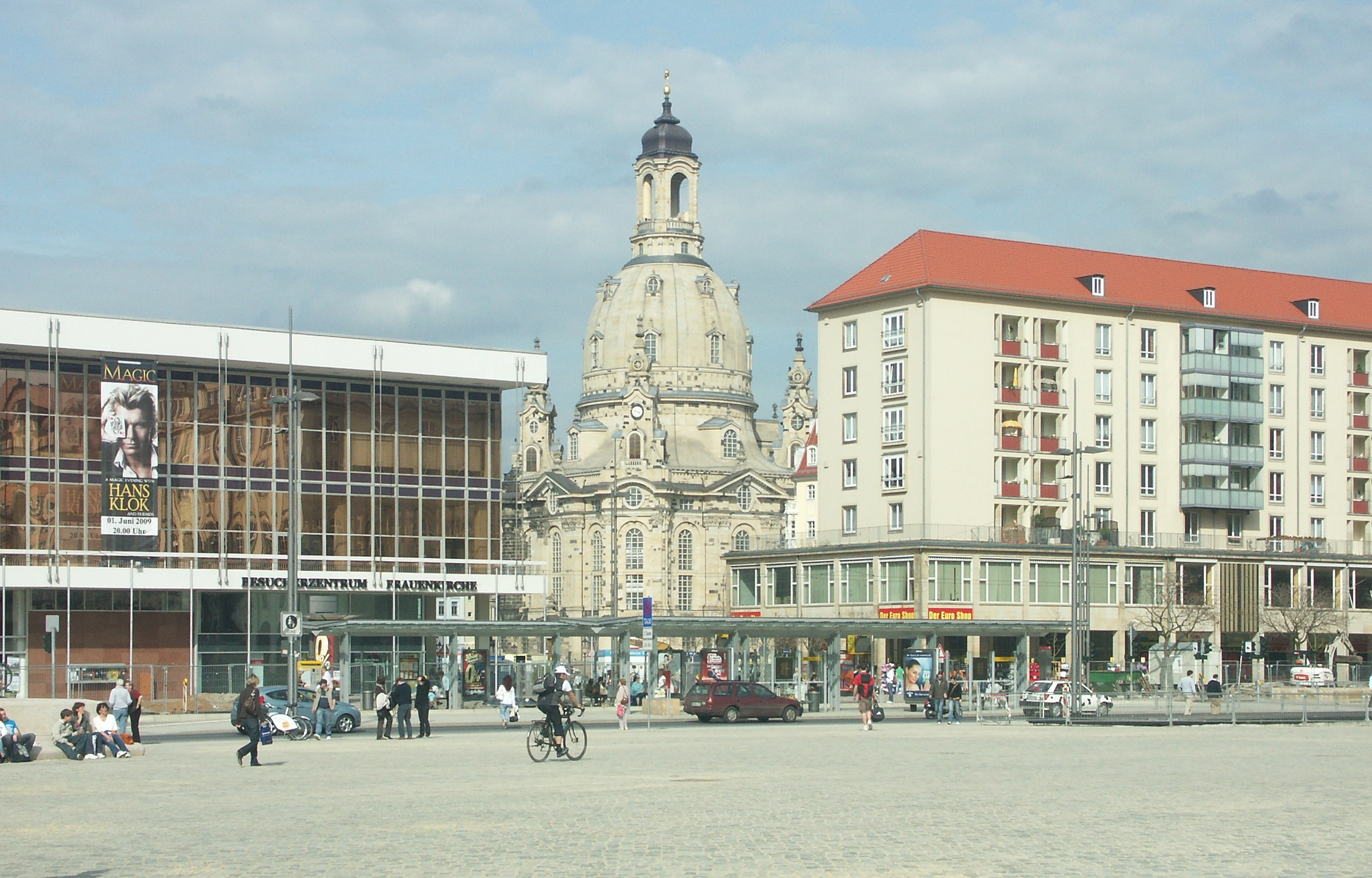
Close-up with Dresden Frauenkirche and row building at Wilsdruffer Straße, 2009

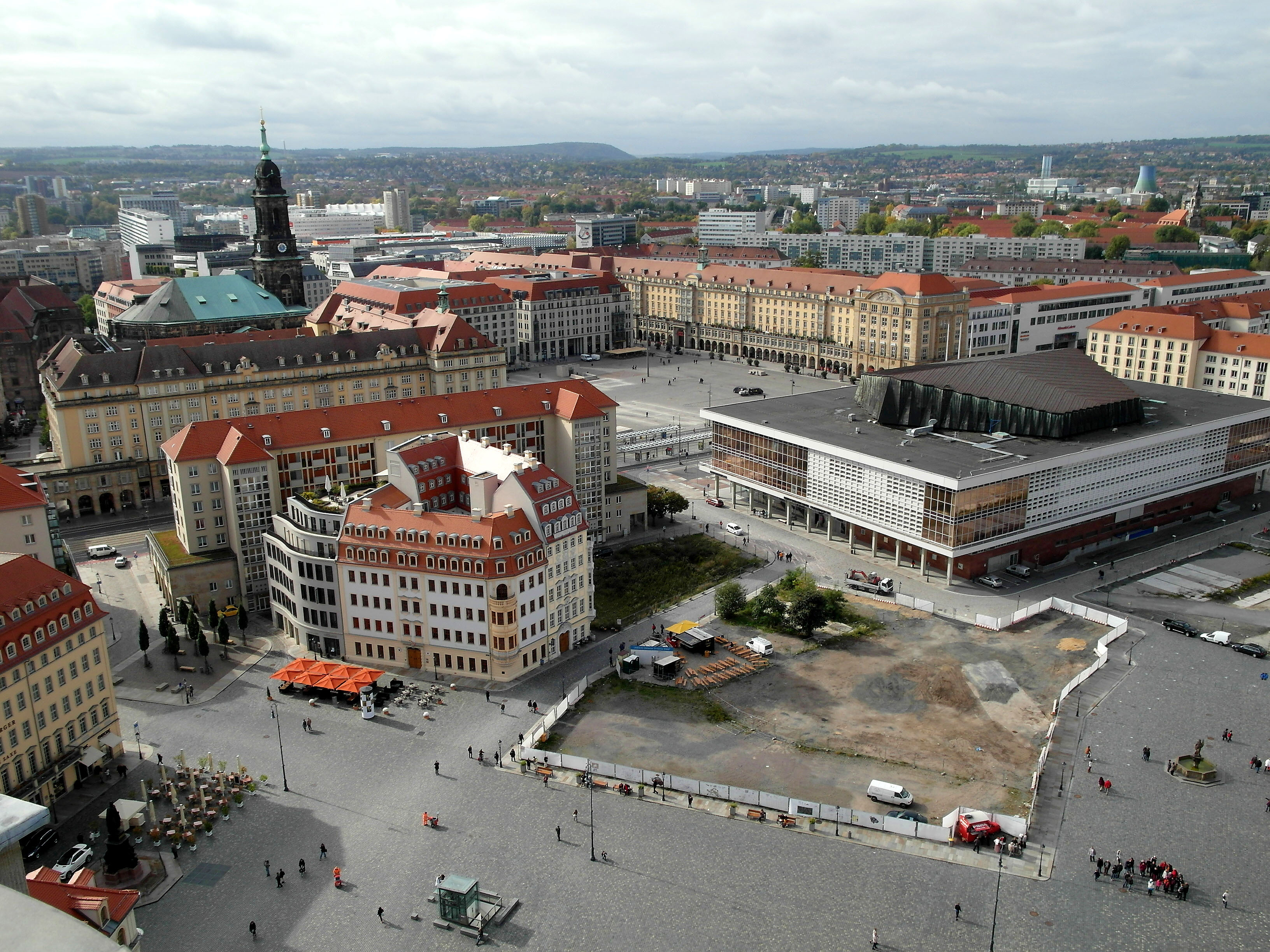
View from the Frauenkirche over the reborn Neumarkt, Kulturpalast and Altmarkt, 2012

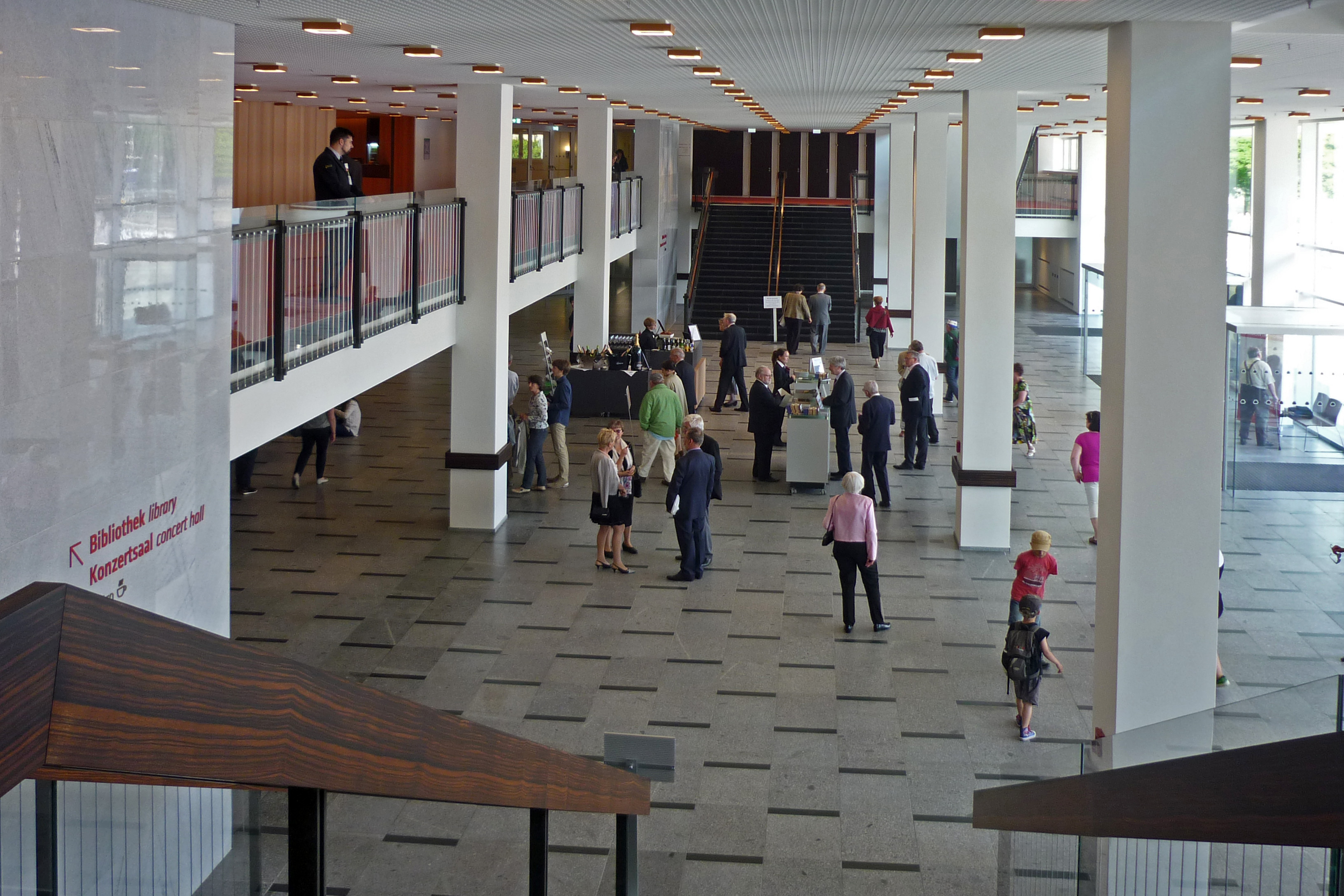
Foyer

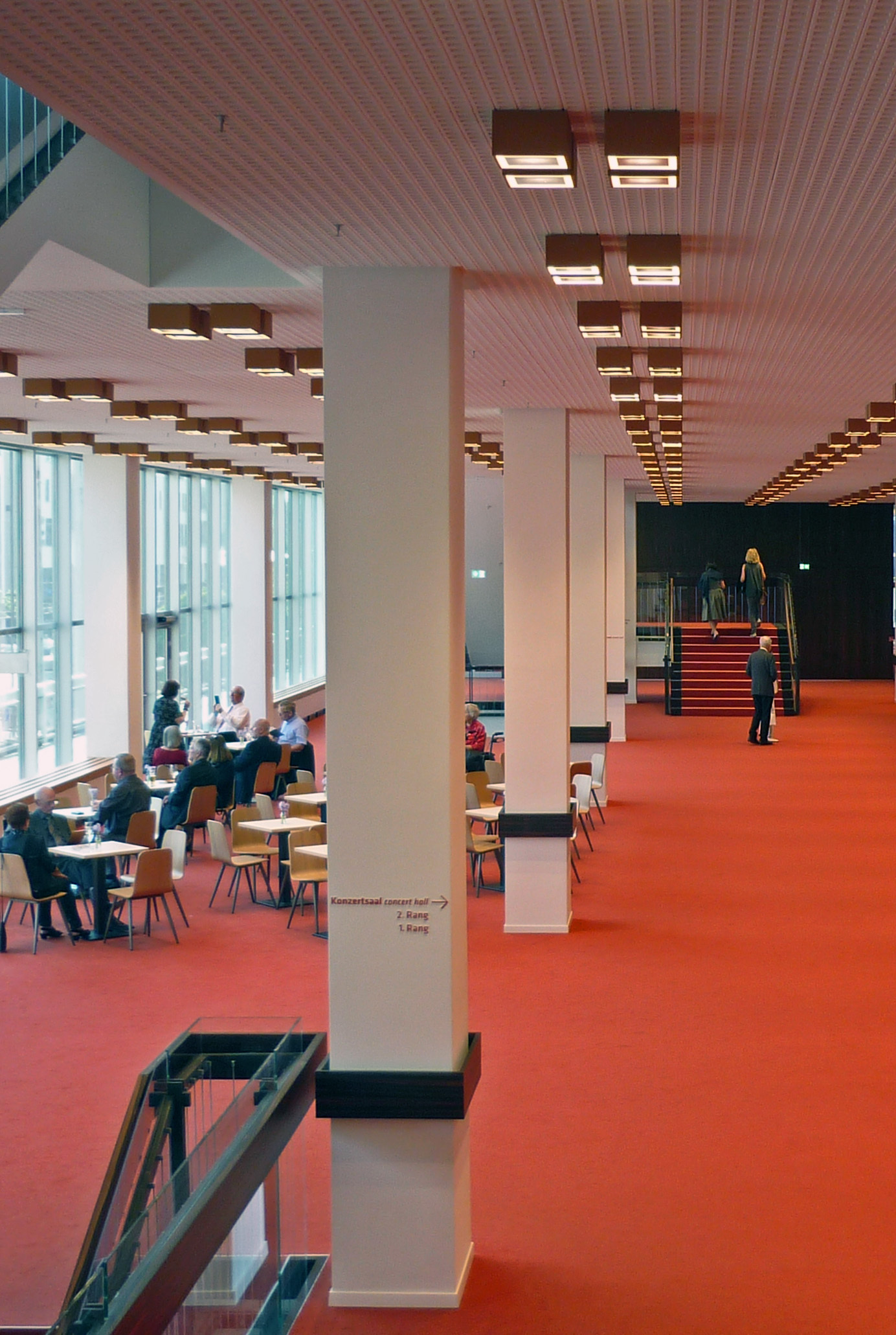
First floor with the wall frieze Unser sozialistisches Leben

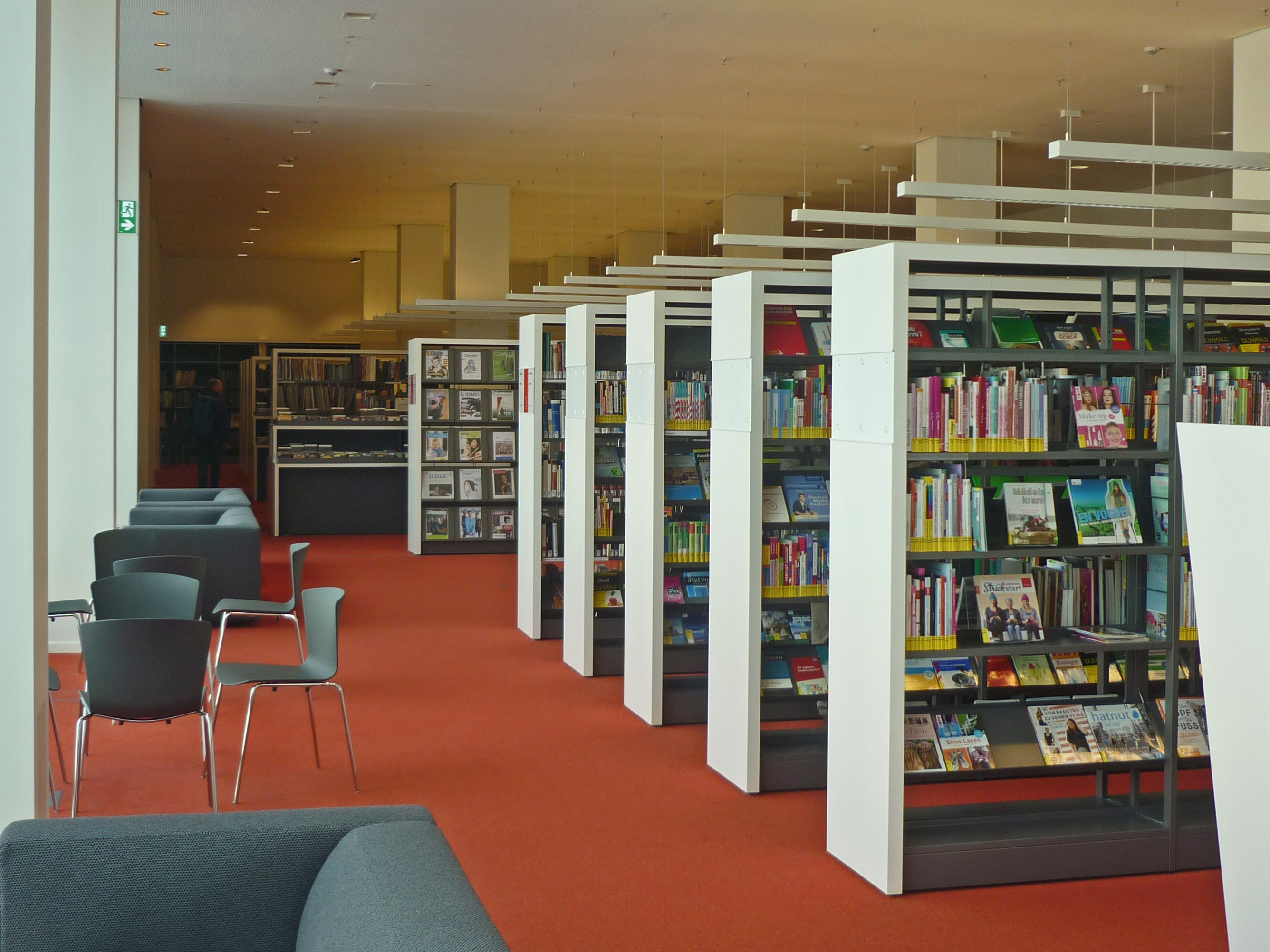
Central Library of the Municipal Libraries

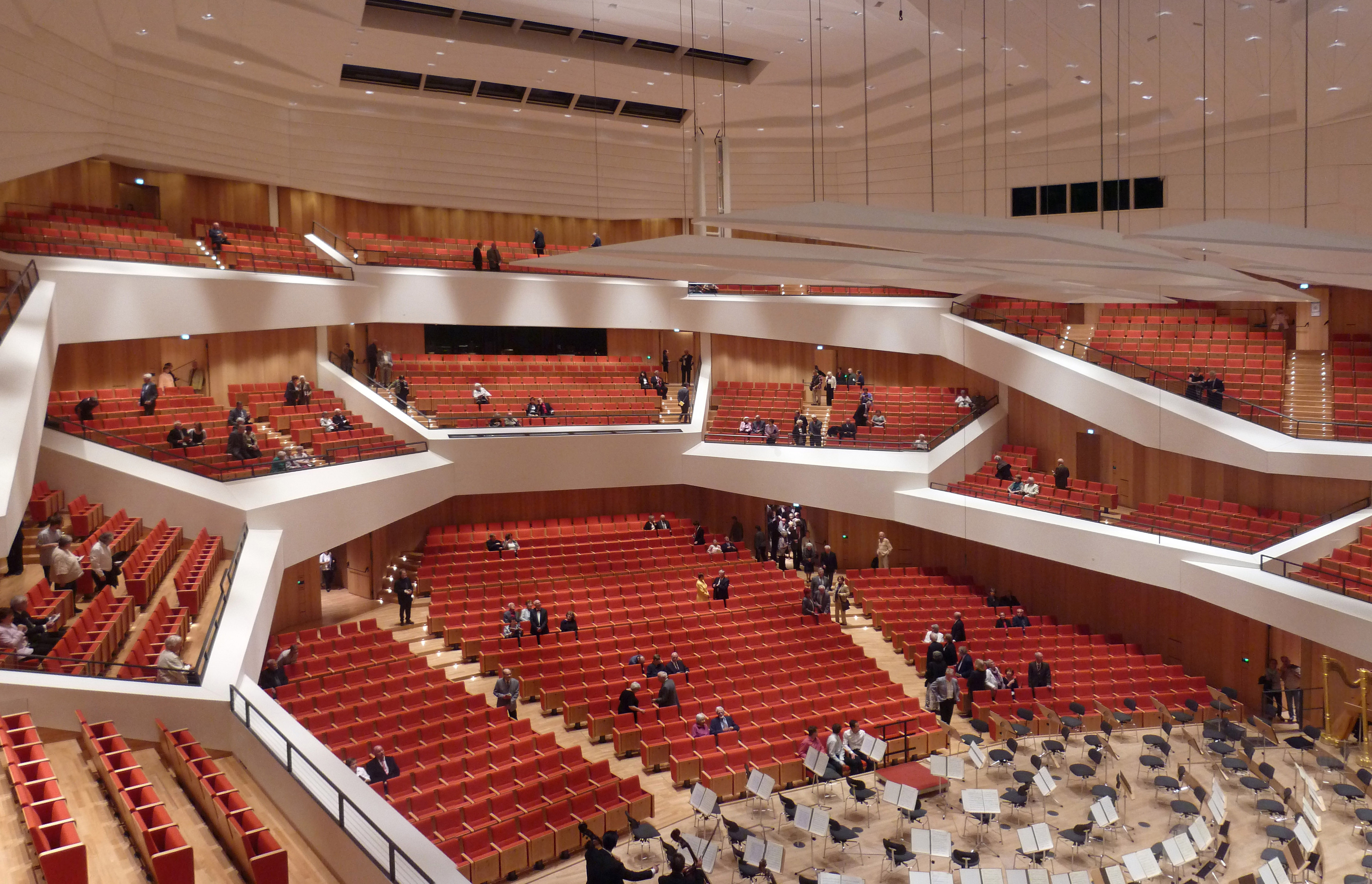
The new concert hall

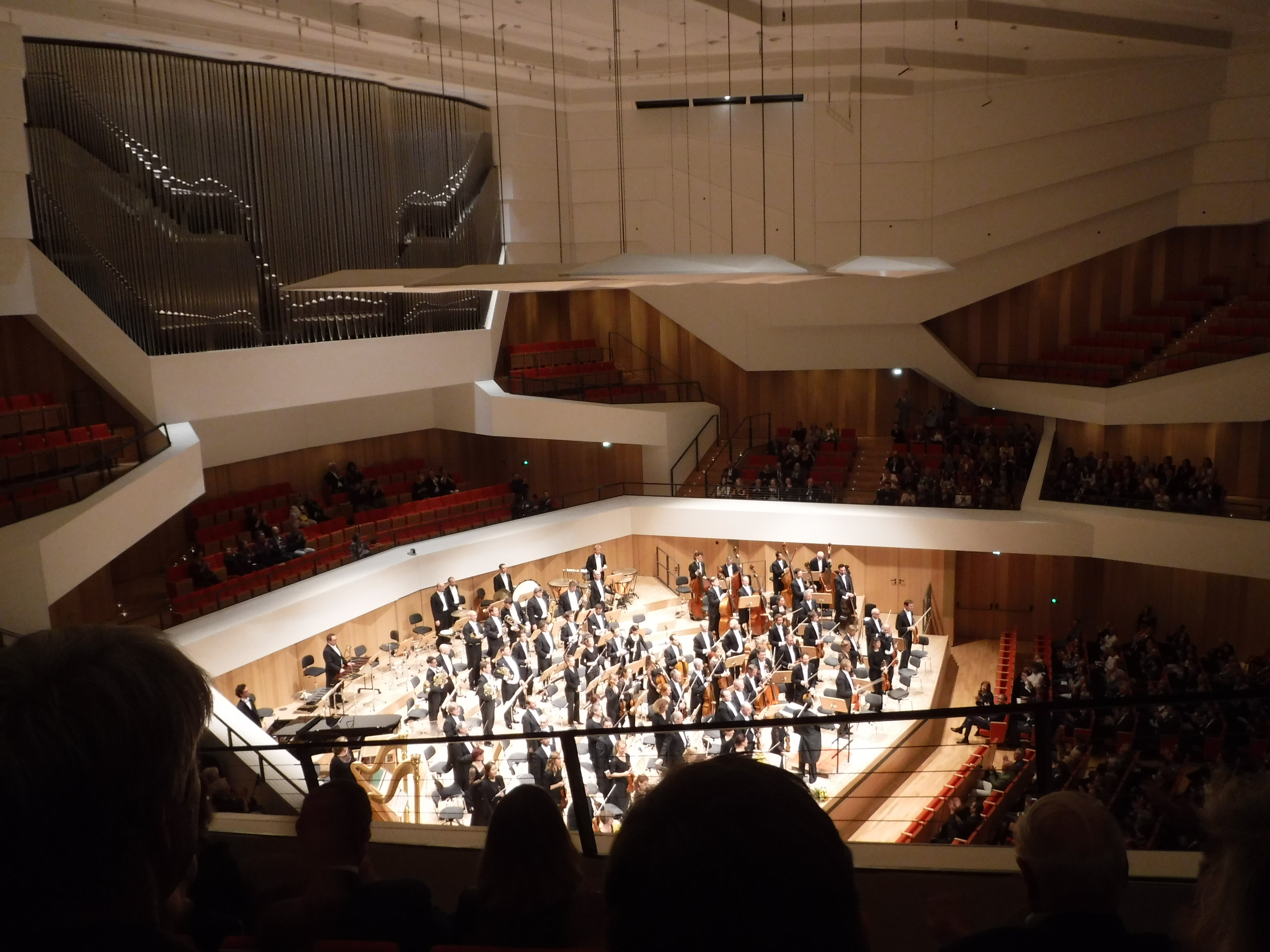
The Dresden Philharmonic with the new organ
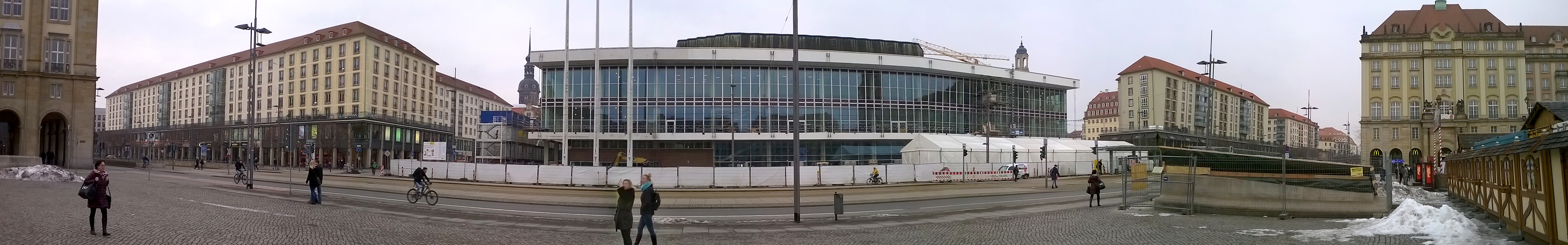
Panorama from the Altmarkt (February 2017)

== Literature ==
- Birk Engmann: Bauen für die Ewigkeit: Monumentalarchitektur des zwanzigsten Jahrhunderts und Städtebau in Leipzig in den fünfziger Jahren. Sax-Verlag, Beucha, Germany, 2006, ISBN 3-934544-81-9, German
- Wolfgang Hänsch: Haus der sozialistischen Kultur. In: Deutsche Architektur. Issue 4, 1968, P. 212–671, German
- Meinhard von Gerkan, Stephan Schütz (Ed.): Kulturpalast Dresden. Publisher Jovis Verlag, Berlin 2017, ISBN 978-3-86859-484-3, German
