= Poème (Chausson) =

1896 composition for violin and orchestra by Ernest Chausson

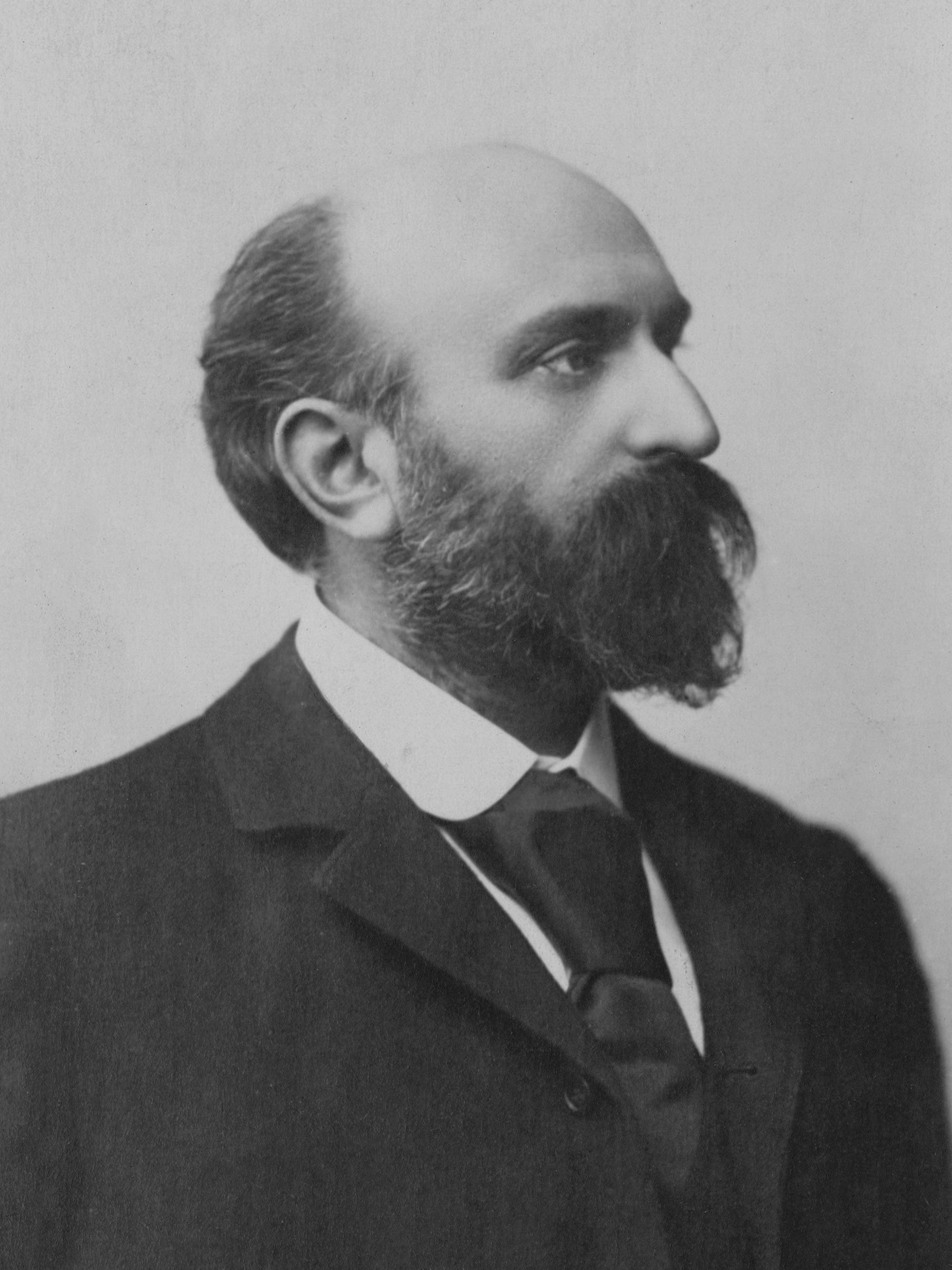
Chausson ca. 1897

Poème, Op. 25, is a composition for violin and orchestra written by Ernest Chausson in 1896. It is a staple of the violinist's repertoire, has very often been recorded and performed, and is generally considered Chausson's best-known and most-loved composition.

== Background ==
Poème was written in response to a request from Eugène Ysaÿe for a violin concerto. Chausson felt unequal to the task of a concerto, writing to Ysaÿe: "I hardly know where to begin with a concerto, which is a huge undertaking, the devil's own task. But I can cope with a shorter work. It will be in very free form with several passages in which the violin plays alone."

It was commenced in April 1896 and finished on 29 June, and was written while Chausson was holidaying in Florence, Italy.

He wrote three different versions of Poème: with orchestra; with piano accompaniment (later rewritten by other hands); and a recently discovered version for violin, string quartet and piano, a companion to his Concert in D for piano, violin and string quartet, Op. 21 (1892). The solo violin parts of these versions are identical except for one minor detail.

The work is notionally in the key of E♭, and lasts about 16 minutes. It was dedicated to Ysaÿe, who gave its early performances.

== Genesis of the title ==
Chausson initially called it Le Chant de l'amour triomphant, then changed it to Poème symphonique, and finally to simply Poème. The first two rejected titles are crossed out on the extant manuscripts.

The original title came from the 1881 romantic novella The Song of Triumphant Love (Le Chant de l'amour triomphant; Песнь торжествующей любви) by the Russian writer Ivan Turgenev, who lived on the estate of the famed mezzo-soprano Pauline Viardot and her husband near Paris; all three were acquaintances of Chausson's. The Viardots' daughter Marianne was engaged for some time to Gabriel Fauré, but broke it off and instead married Alphonse Duvernoy. Turgenev's novella seems to mirror this set of relationships, and it may be that Chausson initially attempted to portray it in music. However, it is clear his final intention was to create a work without extra-musical associations.

== Early performances ==
In the autumn of 1896, Eugène Ysaÿe, Ernest Chausson and their wives were holidaying at Sitges on the Mediterranean coast of Spain. At a party hosted by the Catalan painter Santiago Rusiñol, Ysaÿe and Chausson's wife on piano gave an impromptu sight-read performance of Poème; local townspeople who overheard it demanded it be encored three times. Present at the party were Enrique Granados and possibly Isaac Albéniz.

Poème's formal premiere was at the Nancy Conservatoire on 27 December 1896, conducted by Guy Ropartz, with Ysaÿe as soloist. But it was not really noticed until Ysaÿe gave the Paris premiere, at a Colonne concert on 4 April 1897. Chausson was overcome by the sustained applause, something he had not experienced in his career to that point.

Ysaÿe also gave the first London performance of Poème a week after Chausson's death in 1899.

== Publication ==
Poème was published in May 1897, but not at Chausson's own instigation. His friend Isaac Albéniz submitted the score to Breitkopf & Härtel while he was in Leipzig on a concert tour. They were reluctant to publish the work, considering it "vague and bizarre" and of "extraordinary difficulty", and consequently would have "few adherents" (letter to Albéniz of 27 April 1897). They agreed to publish only when Albéniz undertook to pay for the costs of publication himself. He also gave Breitkopf 300 marks, which they were to send Chausson under the pretence of a royalty. Chausson never knew of Albéniz's role in this episode, which was done solely to boost his confidence in his compositional skills (he did not need the money, as he had financial security through wealth inherited from his father). It was also a way for Albéniz to repay Chausson's support and encouragement of him when he was a struggling student in Paris.

== Instrumentation ==
Poème is scored for solo violin, 2 flutes, 2 oboes, 2 clarinets in B♭, 2 bassoons, 4 horns, 2 trumpets, 3 trombones, tuba, timpani, harp and strings.

== Structure ==
The work starts Lento e misterioso. Subsequent tempo indications are Molto animato, Animato, Poco lento, Poco meno lento, Allegro, Tempo I and the work ends Tranquillo.

It does not follow any formal model but is rhapsodic and moody, with rising and falling tensions and an advanced harmonic style. It strongly reflects the melancholy and introspection with which Chausson was imbued from an early age. (He once wrote to his godmother about his childhood: "I was sad without knowing why, but firmly convinced that I had the best reason in the world for it".)

Joseph Szigeti always believed "the typically Ysaÿean sinuous double-stop passages" in the exposition could not have been written without the inspiration – or, indeed, the direct involvement – of Ysaÿe himself. This was later confirmed by Ysaÿe, who acknowledged he wrote the double-stopping "over Chausson's framework".

Introduction

1st theme

2nd theme

3rd theme

== Other uses ==
Antony Tudor set Poème as a ballet called Jardin aux lilas; it premiered in London in 1936 and was staged in the US in 1940 as Lilac Garden.

== Recordings ==
Violinists who have recorded the work include David Oistrakh, Henryk Szeryng, Vladimir Spivakov, Julia Fischer, James Ehnes, Chantal Juillet, Laurent Korcia, and Bruno Monteiro.
