= Applause =

Form of appreciation or praise expressed by clapping

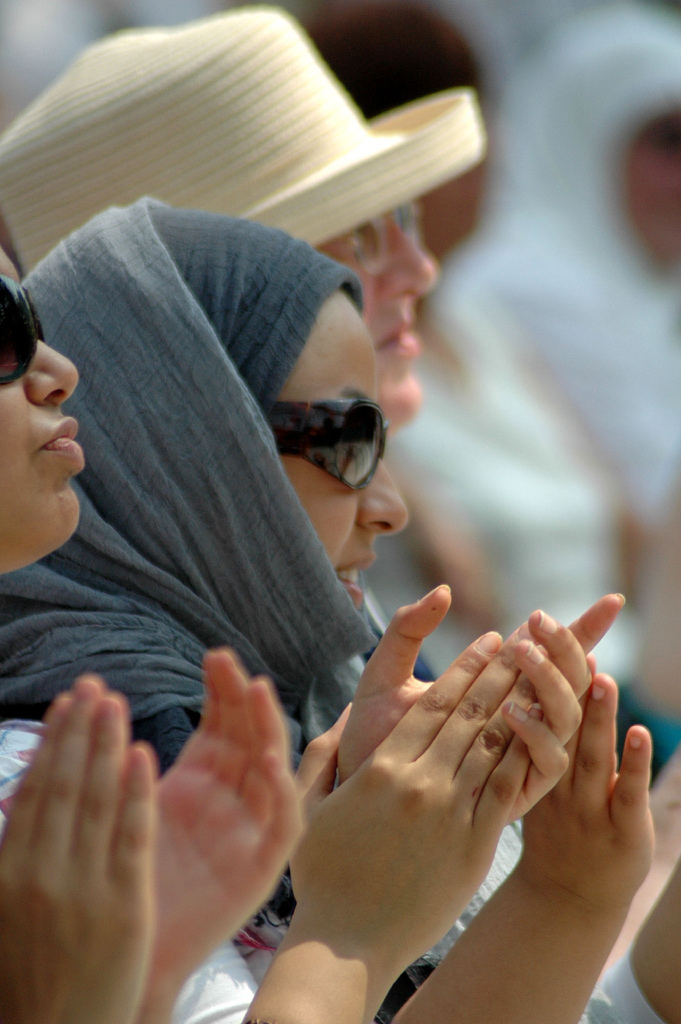
Crowd applause taken at the Liverpool Arabic Arts Festival 2006, Liverpool, England

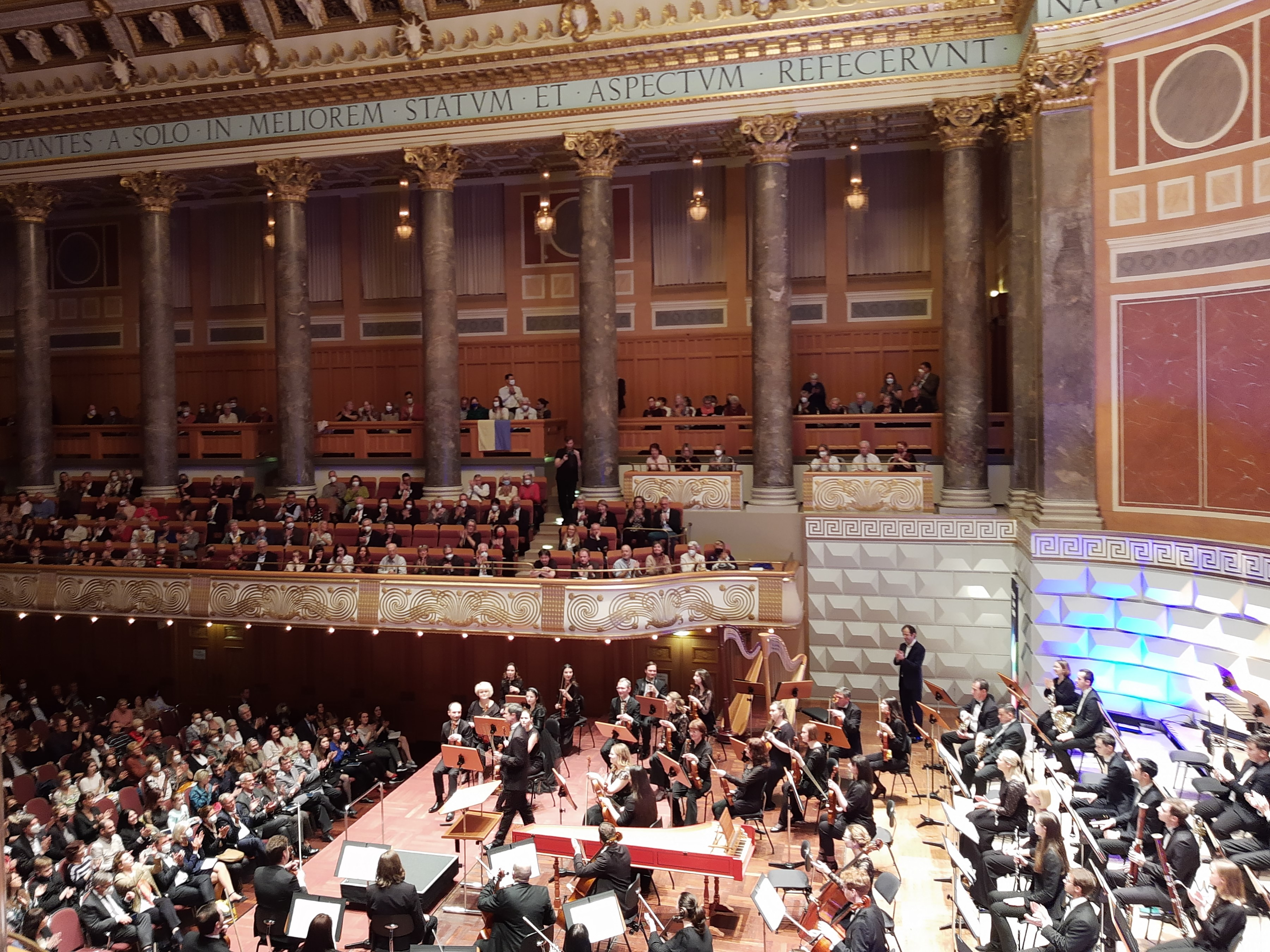
The violinist Aleksey Semenenko comes to receive applause after performing in concert with the Kyiv Symphony Orchestra at the Kurhaus, Wiesbaden, conducted by Luigi Gaggero, who stands at the back of the stage.

Applause (Latin applaudere, to strike upon, clap) is primarily a form of ovation or praise expressed by the act of clapping, or striking the palms of the hands together. Audiences usually applaud after a performance, such as a concert, speech or play, as a sign of enjoyment, approval, and praise.

== History ==
Applause
Audience applauding a performance of Cavalleria rusticana by Pietro Mascagni (2011)

The age of the custom of applauding is uncertain, but is widespread amongst human cultures. Varieties of applause typically serve as the means to show appreciation as an audience participant and fulfils the need to be included. The variety of its forms is limited only by the capacity for devising means of making a noise (e.g., stomping of feet or rapping of fists or hands on a table). However, within each culture it is usually subject to conventions.

The ancient Romans had set rituals at public performances to express degrees of approval: snapping the finger and thumb, clapping with the flat or hollow palm, and waving the flap of the toga. Upper-class spectators expressed approval by waving their togas, while lower-class spectators, who were not allowed to wear togas, waved pieces of cloth, which may have been a precursor to the handkerchief. Aurelian, Roman emperor from AD 270 to 275, substituted the waving of napkins (orarium) that he had distributed to the Roman people for the toga-flapping. In Roman theatre, at the close of the play, the chief actor called out "Valete et plaudite!" (farewell and applaud), and the audience, guided by an unofficial choregos, chanted their approval antiphonally. This was often organized and paid for.

Similarly, a claque (IPA: /klak/) (French for "slapping") was an organized body of professional applauders in French theatres and opera houses who were paid by the performer(s) to create the illusion of an increased level of approval by the audience. Alternatively, if they were not paid, they would boo and throw things at the stage. By the 1830s this had become commonplace. Heads of theatres and opera houses could get many professional clappers whenever they needed a boost. The leader of the claque would decide when and where to begin the cheering. The claque consisted of people participating in a variety of roles: some would memorize the show to emphasize key scenes or moments, so-called "laughers" may feign laughter so as to incite the audience to laugh along, "criers" would fake tears, and some were there just to keep the mood up. The emergence of claques made composers like Gustav Mahler, Robert Schumann and Felix Mendelssohn begin to request in their scores that their works were to be performed with no break between movements as to avoid applause, becoming a catalyst to the well-known applause etiquette upheld in many classical performance settings.

In Christianity customs of the theatre were adopted by the churches. The early Christian scholar Eusebius says that Paul of Samosata encouraged the congregation to indicate approval of his preaching by waving linen cloths (οθοναις), and in the 4th and 5th centuries applause of the rhetoric of popular preachers had become an established custom. Applause in church eventually fell out of fashion, however. Partly due to the influence of the quasi-religious atmosphere of the performances of the German composer Richard Wagner's operas at the Bayreuth Festspielhaus, the reverential spirit that inspired this soon extended back to the theatre and the concert hall.

== Protocol and variations ==
=== Protocol ===
Well-recognized politicians, actors, musicians and speakers often receive applause as soon as they first appear on stage, even before any performance activity has transpired. This accolade is given to indicate admiration for their past achievements, and is not a response to the performance the audience is attending.

On some occasions, applause occurs in the middle of an event. The president of the United States, in the State of the Union Address, is often interrupted by applause; tracking the number and duration of such interruptions has become a trend on various American television news channels. It is often customary for jazz performers to receive applause in the middle of a tune, after completing an improvisational solo. It is also typical to applaud at the end of a musical number in a musical theatre piece.

In most performances, if spectators greatly enjoy a performance, mainly in performances of classical music, they may also accompany by throwing flowers onstage. The volume of applause after a performance has also been shown to change the evaluation of the performance by the audience.

Extended applause at the conclusion of an event, usually but not always resulting in a standing ovation, implies approval above and beyond ordinary measure, and compels the performer to return in acknowledgement—known as a curtain call—and at times proceed to an encore.

=== In classical music ===
During classical music performances, it is customary to applaud at the end of each piece and at the beginning of the show. Usually the conductor will face the audience when it is an appropriate time to applaud. Standing ovations and encores have become common at classical concerts, but do not always occur.

Indiscriminate applause is widely considered a violation of classical music concert etiquette: Applause is discouraged between movements, reserved instead for the end of the entire work. Yelling, jumping, and other disruptive actions are discouraged as well, although cheering can be appropriate during a standing ovation.

There have been a number of attempts to further restrict applause in various circumstances. For example, court theatres in Berlin prohibit applause during the performance and before the curtain call (although elsewhere in Germany, this is felt to be beyond public tastes).

By contrast, opera performances have traditionally been interrupted by applause at the end of an aria or certain other set pieces, and many opera scores reflect a break in the music at places where applause would typically occur. Regarding this practice as a distraction, Wagner headed it off by eliminating breaks in the score within each act; the arias in his operas do not end in a "full stop" but flow into the next section of the music, until the end of the act is reached. Even then, in light of the quasi-religious atmosphere of the first act of Parsifal, it is traditional for the audience not to applaud at all at the end of that act, but file out of their seats in silence.

=== In church ===
Applause during church services is traditionally regarded as taboo, in light of the sanctity of the proceedings; focus is on the aspect of worship rather than the personality of the individual preaching or singing during the service. This rule may be relaxed to permit applause in honor of the newly married couple when they may turn to be greeted by the congregation following the exchange of vows. Applause may also be permitted at certain services in honor of a specific individual, such as a baptism or the ordination of a new priest or minister. In less traditional congregations, particularly in contemporary, evangelical megachurches, a more casual atmosphere exists and applause may be encountered as frequently as at any secular performance.

=== In legislative bodies ===
In the Parliament of the United Kingdom and in Parliament of India clapping is generally prohibited (however, this rule is frequently broken and is non-existent when there are speeches by foreign heads of state). Instead, members of Parliament and members of the House of Lords and in India members of lok sabha and rajya sabha generally will show support by desk thumping or by shouting "hear, hear!". In the House of Commons of Canada, by contrast, clapping is customary and frequent.

=== In air travel ===
In various countries, airplane passengers often tend to applaud the landing upon completion of a flight and when they have felt the plane's wheels touch down and have run a short but satisfactory course down the runway. The purpose of this custom is unclear.

=== At film festivals ===
At film festivals, it is normal to have applause (usually a standing ovation) after a film is shown. These ovations usually last longer than usual, and sometimes exceed the 20-minute mark. Most of the time, the applause is for the film's director and actors, and not for the film itself. Festivals such as Cannes and Venice have become examples of applause, and generally, their duration is used in the film's publicity material to indicate that the material was approved.

=== Variations ===
A golf clap is a form of quiet clapping, so named because it is the preferred form of applause for golfers; louder forms of applause are discouraged at golf tournaments so as not to disturb other golfers, who may be in the process of attempting a shot. Golf claps are sometimes used at other events to heckle or to show sarcasm. Similarly, in the game of snooker, a good cue shot, a difficult pot, or a 'snooker' which is difficult to escape from will be rewarded by the opponent tapping their cue several times on the table edge.

Likewise, string musicians of an orchestra use bobbing their bows in the air or gently tapping them on their instruments' strings as a substitute for applause. Wind section members will generally lightly stamp their feet or pat one hand on their leg to show approval to a conductor or soloist, while percussionists often rap drumsticks together. An even more subtle form of approval may be exhibited by a member of an orchestra during a formal rehearsal or performance when a colleague performs particularly well, usually a slight shuffle of the foot on the floor or hand on the knee. These subtle forms of applause may not be recognized as such by the audience. Outright applause by performers for other performers, although increasingly common, is traditionally regarded as gauche, self-congratulatory, and usurping of the audience's prerogative (and sole task in this respect) to provide accolades when they feel that the performance merits it.

In skateboarding culture, when a skater performs and lands a manoeuvre exceptionally well the observers will bang their own boards against the ground to express approval or encouragement.

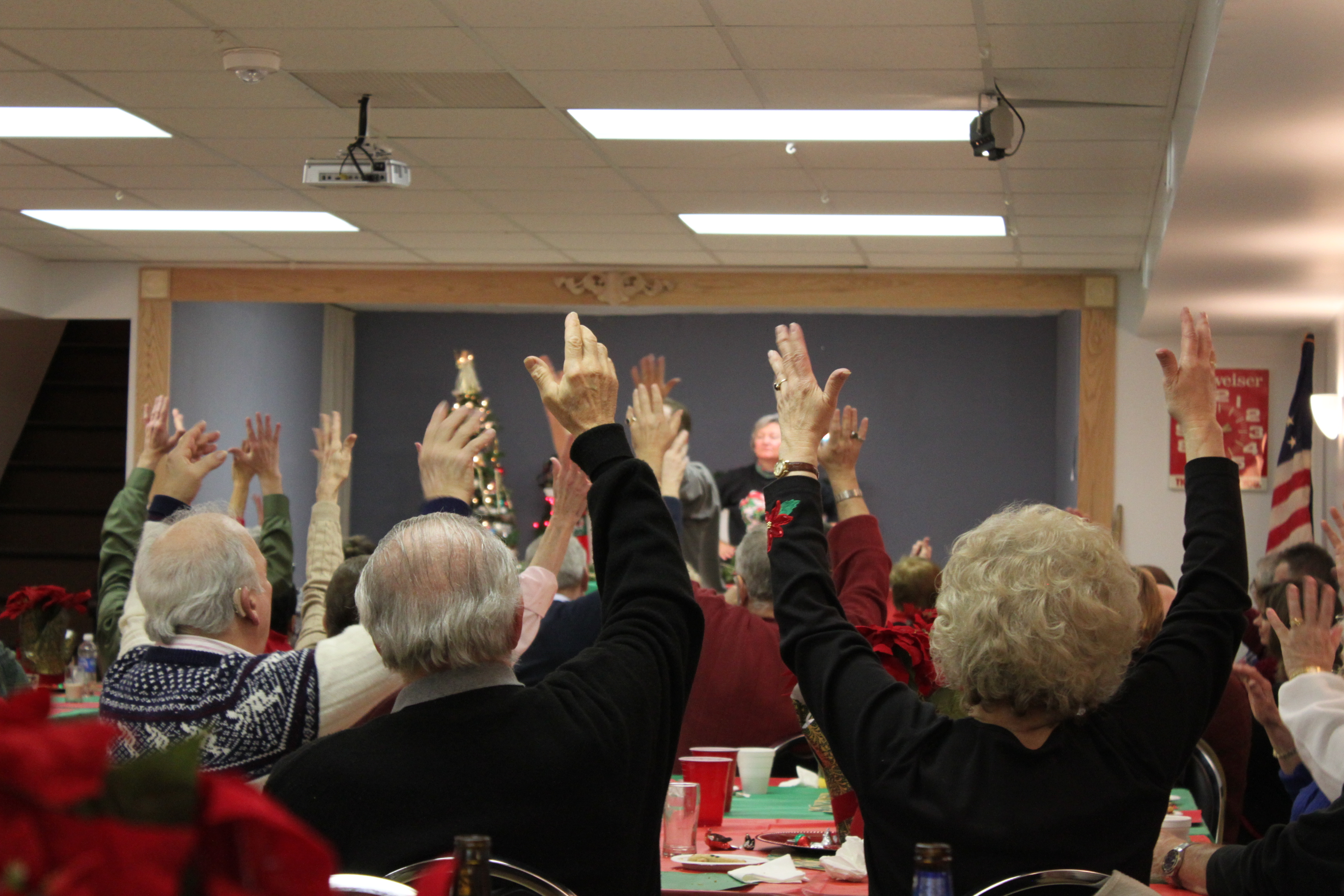
Visual applause pictured at the Pittsburgh Deaf Clubhouse

In deaf culture deaf audiences will use a more visually expressive variant of clapping. Instead of clapping their palms together, they raise their hands straight up with outstretched fingers and twist their wrists. However, in a situation more specific to hearing culture, the traditional clap is used.

In poetry performances applause often takes the form of finger snapping in order to express approval to the performer without being loud and disruptive.

In some countries, applause may be used to indicate respect for a recently deceased person in some instances, such as at a funeral procession. A recent phenomenon in Britain and Israel is the use of a minute's applause, which has come to replace the traditional minute's silence. In Britain it is used especially at football matches, and in Israel also at basketball matches and other sports. However, in most countries applause for a deceased person is still widely frowned upon and not recommended because it may be misinterpreted as rudeness or joy.

In German-speaking countries it is customary for university students to rap their knuckles on the desks after each lecture. The same technique is used in German-speaking countries to express approval at meetings.

In Russian-speaking cultures performance applause can morph into unison/synchronized clapping rather than staying individualized and multi-patterned.

In Jamaica people may bang lids and pot covers together during celebratory events such as a victory at the Olympic Games or the Miss World competitions.

== Slow handclaps in film ==
Another type of "slow handclap" is used as a dramatic device, often forming the conclusion of dramatic turning points in films. After some dramatic speech, one audience member claps slowly, then another, and then a few more, until the trickle of clapping gives way to roaring applause, often ending in a standing ovation. This is also referred to as a crescendo applause, named for the increasing level of volume it produces.

== See also ==
- Acclamation
- Applause sign
- Booing
- Cheering
- Clapping
- Clap-o-meter
- Concert etiquette
- Standing ovation
- Ululation
- Kentish fire
