= Heckler =

Verbal harasser

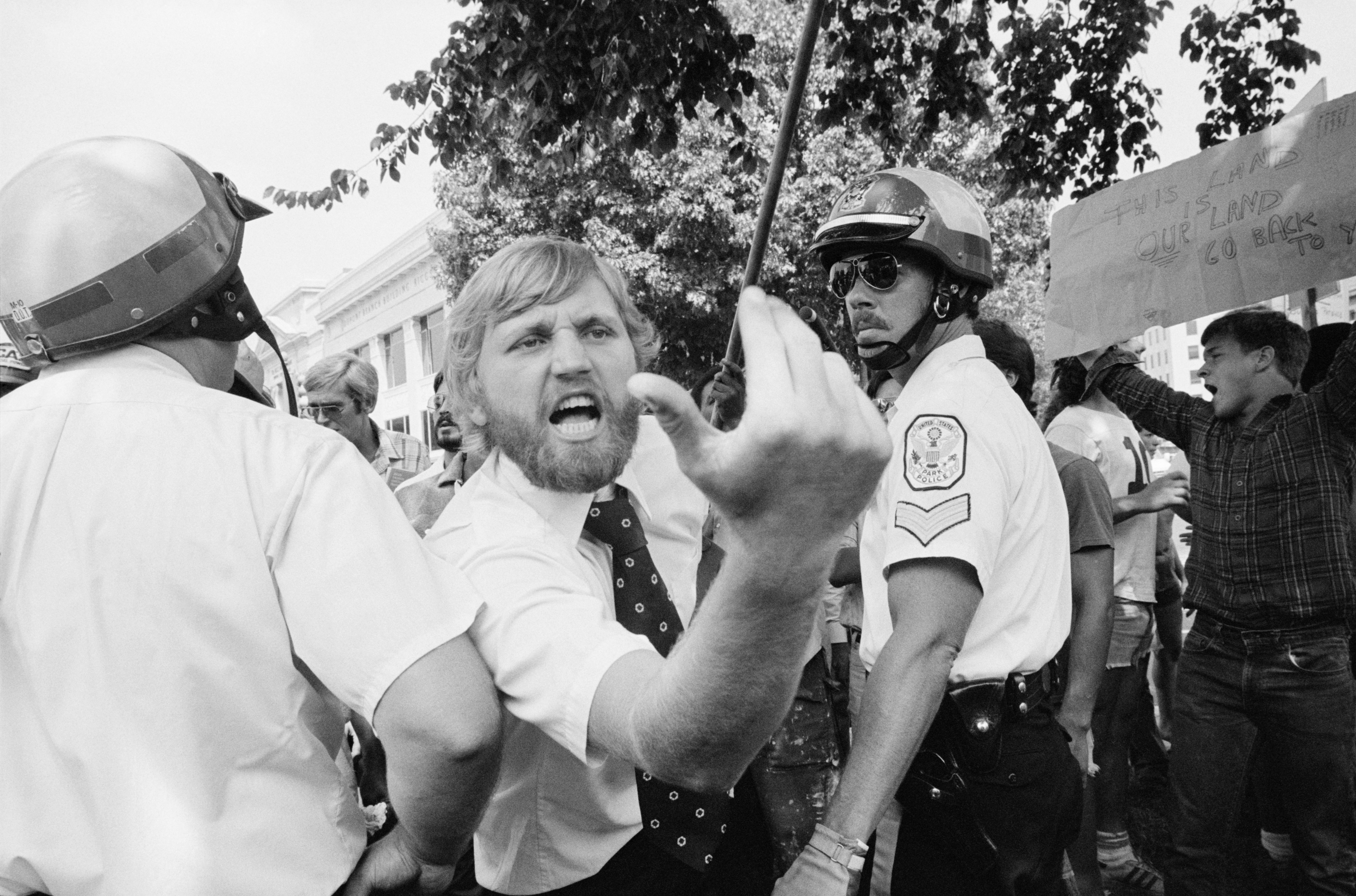
A heckler in Washington, D.C., leans across a police line toward a demonstration of Iranians during the Iran hostage crisis, August 1980.

A heckler is a person who harasses and tries to disconcert others with questions, challenges, or gibes. Hecklers are often known to shout discouraging comments at a performance or event, or to interrupt set-piece speeches, with the intent of disturbing performers or participants.

== Origin ==
Although the word heckler, which originated from the textile trade, was first attested in the mid-15th century, its use as "person who harasses" is from 1885. To heckle was to tease or comb out flax or hemp fibres. The additional meaning, to interrupt speakers with awkward or embarrassing questions, was first used in Scotland, and specifically in early 19th century Dundee, a town where the hecklers who combed the flax had established a reputation as the most vocal element in the labor force. In the heckling factory, one heckler would read out the day's news while the others worked, to the accompaniment of interruptions and furious debate.

Heckling was a major part of the vaudeville theater. Sometimes it was incorporated into the play. Milton Berle's weekly TV variety series in the 1960s featured a heckler named Sidney Spritzer (German/Yiddish for 'squirter') played by Borscht Belt comic Irving Benson. In the 1970s and 1980s, The Muppet Show, which was also built around a vaudeville theme, featured two hecklers, Statler and Waldorf (two old men named after famous hotels). Heckles are now particularly likely to be heard at comedy performances, to unsettle or compete with the performer.

== Politics ==
Politicians speaking before live audiences have less latitude to deal with hecklers. In the early 1930s, before becoming Premier of Ontario, Mitchell Hepburn stood on top of a manure spreader, apologizing to the crowd for speaking from a Tory platform, at which someone in the crowd shouted, "Well, wind 'er up Mitch, she's never carried a bigger load!"

Legally, such conduct may constitute protected free speech. Strategically, coarse or belittling retorts to hecklers entail personal risk disproportionate to any gain. Some politicians, however, have been known to improvise a relevant and witty response despite these pitfalls. For example, Harold Wilson, British Prime Minister in the 1960s, responded to a heckler disrupting his speech in the following manner:

Heckler: (interrupting a passage in a Wilson speech about Labour's spending plans) "What about Vietnam?"
Wilson: "The government has no plans to increase public expenditure in Vietnam."
Heckler: "Rubbish!"
Wilson: "I'll come to your special interest in a minute, sir."

Heckler: (a supporter of white supremacy in Rhodesia) "Why are you talking to savages?"

Wilson : "We don't talk to savages. We just let them into our meetings."

Martin Luther King Jr.'s 1963 "I Have a Dream" speech was largely a response to supporter Mahalia Jackson interrupting his prepared speech to shout "Tell them about the dream, Martin". At that point, King stopped reading from his previously prepared speech and improvised the remainder of the speech—‌this improvised portion of the speech is the best-known part of the speech and frequently rated as one of the best of all time.

During a campaign stop just before winning the Presidency in 1980, Ronald Reagan was heckled by an audience member who kept interrupting him during a speech. Reagan tried to go on with his speech three times, but after being interrupted yet again glared at the heckler and snapped "Aw, shut up!" The audience immediately gave him a standing ovation.

In 1992, then-Presidential candidate Bill Clinton was interrupted by Bob Rafsky, a member of the AIDS activism group ACT UP, who accused him of "dying of ambition to be president" during a rally. After becoming visibly agitated, Clinton took the microphone off the stand, pointed to the heckler and directly responded to him by saying, "[...] I have treated you and all of the other people who have interrupted my rallies with a hell of a lot more respect than you treated me. And it's time to start thinking about that!" Clinton was then met with raucous applause.

On 9 September 2009, Representative Joe Wilson (R-SC) shouted "You lie!" at President Barack Obama after President Obama stated that his health care plan would not subsidize coverage for undocumented noncitizens during a speech he was making to a joint session of Congress. Wilson later apologized for his outburst.

On 25 November 2013, Ju Hong, a 24-year-old South Korean immigrant without legal documentation, shouted at Obama to use his executive power to stop deportation of unauthorized noncitizens. Obama said "If, in fact, I could solve all these problems without passing laws in Congress, then I would do so." "But we're also a nation of laws, that's part of our tradition," he continued. "And so the easy way out is to try to yell and pretend like I can do something by violating our laws. And what I'm proposing is the harder path, which is to use our democratic processes to achieve the same goal."

=== Audience control ===
One modern political approach to discourage heckling is to ensure that major events are given before a "tame" audience of sympathizers, or conducted to allow restrictions on who may remain on the premises. The downside is this may make heckling incidents even more newsworthy. This happened to Tony Blair during a photo op visit to a hospital during the 2001 general election campaign, and again in 2003 during a speech.

In 2004, American Vice President Dick Cheney was interrupted mid-speech by Perry Patterson, a middle-aged mother in a pre-screened rally audience. After various supportive outbursts that were permitted ("Four more years", "Go Bush!"), Patterson uttered "No, no, no, no" and was removed from the speech area and told to leave. She refused, and was arrested for criminal trespass.

Later, in 2005, Cheney received some heckling that was broadcast during his trip to New Orleans, after Hurricane Katrina ravaged the city. The heckling occurred during a press conference in Gulfport, Mississippi, in an area that was cordoned off for public safety reasons, and then further secured for the press conference. Nevertheless, emergency room physician Ben Marble got close enough to the proceedings and could be heard yelling, "Go fuck yourself, Mr. Cheney". Cheney laughed it off and continued speaking. The heckle was a reference to Cheney's use of the phrase the previous year, when during a heated exchange with Senator Patrick Joseph Leahy, Vermont, he said "fuck yourself" on the floor of the senate.

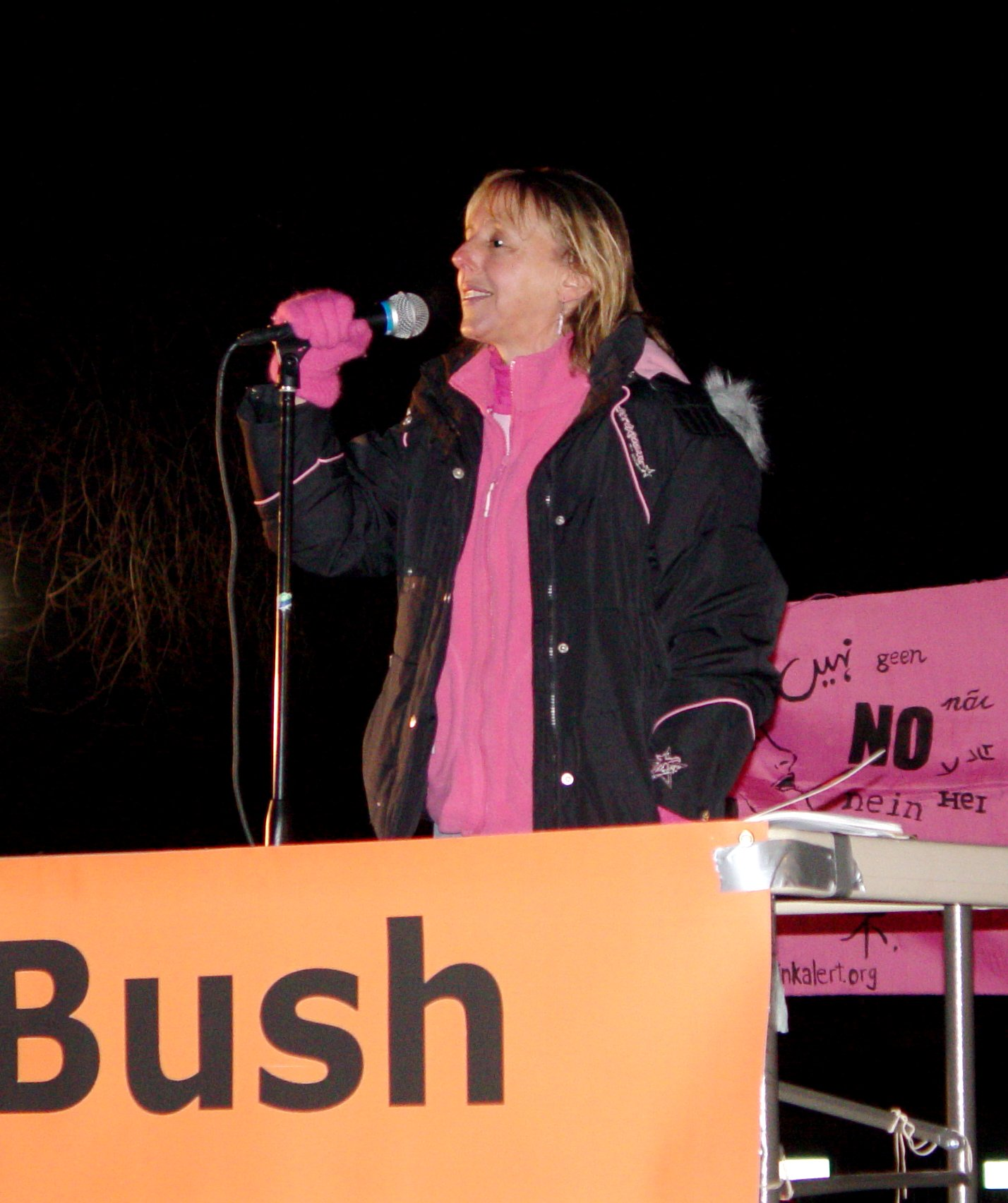
Medea Benjamin heckled a speech by Barack Obama in 2013

On 15 October 2005, The Scotsman reported "Iranian ambassador Dr Seyed Mohammed Hossein Adeli... speaking at the annual Campaign for Nuclear Disarmament conference... During his speech to the CND several people were told to leave the room following protests at Iran's human rights record. Several protesters shouted "Fascists" at the ambassador and the organisers of the conference. Walter Wolfgang, the 82-year-old peace campaigner who was forced out of the Labour Party conference last month, was in the audience."

On Thursday, 20 April 2006, a heckler from the Falun Gong spiritual movement entered the US White House grounds as a reporter and interrupted a formal arrival ceremony for Chinese president Hu Jintao. Moments into Hu's speech at the event, Wang Wenyi, perched on the top tier of the stands reserved for the press, began screaming in English and Chinese: "President Bush stop him. Stop this visit. Stop the killing and torture." The heckler was allowed to continue for several minutes despite the heavy presence of security personnel typical of such high level meeting of officials, prompting speculation that the incident was planned with the tacit cooperation of the White House in order to embarrass the Chinese president, hence possibly making this heckling incident one which was found justified by its audience. President Bush later apologised to his guest.

Medea Benjamin of Code Pink repeatedly interrupted a major speech by President Barack Obama regarding United States policy in the war on terror at the National Defense University on 23 May 2013.

== Sport ==
Hecklers can also appear at sporting events, and usually (but not always) direct their taunts at a visiting team. Fans of the Philadelphia Eagles American football team are notorious for heckling; among the most infamous incidents were booing and subsequently throwing snowballs at a performer dressed as Santa Claus in a halftime show in 1968, and cheering at the career-ending injury of visiting team player Michael Irvin in 1999. Often, sports heckling will also involve throwing objects onto the field; this has led most sports stadiums to ban glass containers and bottlecaps. Another famous heckler is Robert Szasz, who regularly attends Tampa Bay Rays baseball games and is known for loudly heckling one opposing player per game or series. Former Yugoslav football star Dejan Savićević was involved in an infamous incident with a heckler in which during an interview, a man on the street was heard shouting off-camera: "You're a piece of shit!". Savićević berated the man, and went on to finish the interview, without missing a beat.

In English and Scottish football, heckling and swearing from the stands, and football chants such as "Who Ate All the Pies?" are common.

Australian sporting audiences are known for creative heckling. Perhaps the most famous is Yabba who had a grandstand at the Sydney Cricket Ground named after him, and now a statue.

The sport of cricket is particularly notorious for heckling between the teams themselves, which is known as sledging.

At the NBA Drafts of recent years, many fans have gone with heckling ESPN NBA analyst Stephen A. Smith. Most notably, the Stephen A. Smith Heckling Society of Gentlemen heckles him with a sock puppet dubbed as Stephen A. himself.

Tennis fans are also fairly noted for heckling. Some may call out during a service point to distract either player. Another common heckle from tennis fans is cheering after a service fault, which is considered to be rude and unsporting.

In 2009, then Toronto Blue Jays outfielder Alex Ríos was a victim of a heckling incident outside after a fund-raising event. The incident occurred after Ríos declined to sign an autograph for a young fan, the same day he went 0 for 5 with 5 strikeouts in a game against the Los Angeles Angels. An older man yelled "The way you played today Alex, you should be lucky someone wants your autograph." Ríos then replied with "Who gives a fuck", repeating it until being ushered into a vehicle. Ríos did apologize the next day, but was eventually placed on waivers and claimed by the Chicago White Sox later that year.

== Music ==
The heckling of Bob Dylan at the Manchester Free Trade Hall in 1966 is one of the most famous examples in music history. During a quiet moment in between songs, an audience member shouts very loudly and clearly, "Judas!" referencing Dylan's so-called betrayal of folk music by "going electric". Dylan replied: "I don't believe you, you're a liar!" before telling his band to "Play it fucking loud!" They played an acidic version of "Like a Rolling Stone". This incident was captured on tape and the full concert was released as volume four of Dylan's Live Bootleg Series.

== Stand-up comedy ==
In stand-up comedy, a heckler is what separates the medium from theatre; at any time during the show (either indirectly or directly), a heckler may interrupt a comedian's set. Hecklers want the stand-up to break the fourth wall. Most sources claim that heckling is uncommon. Heckling is more likely to occur at open stage performances and performances where alcoholic beverages are being consumed; it is regarded as a sign of audience members becoming impatient with what they regard as a low-quality performance. New comics are often underprepared to handle hecklers properly.

In addition, live comedy venues tend to discourage heckling via signage and admissions policy, but tend to tolerate it as it creates customer loyalty. The etiquette of exactly how much heckling is tolerated differs immensely from venue to venue, however, but is generally more likely to be tolerated in blue-collar or working-class venues.

Comedians generally dislike heckling. Hecklers may rarely threaten or physically assault comedians. Even more rarely, comedians may receive death threats.

=== Countering ===
Comedians counter hecklers by controlling the flow of conversation. A comedian cannot completely ignore a heckler without undermining the performance. Comedians devise a strategy for quashing such outbursts, usually by having a repertoire of comebacks for hecklers—known as savers, heckler lines, squelchers, or squelches—on hand; those who handle the moment in an off-the-cuff manner do so by giving the heckler "enough rope to hang themselves". Stewart Lee treats heckles as genuine inquiries. Jerry Seinfeld is a "Heckle Therapist", who verbally sympathizes with the heckler to confuse the heckler and win the audience over. Some comedians will get hecklers to repeat themselves to take away the momentum and laughter from the heckle. Phyllis Diller would have her light technician shine a spotlight on hecklers to make them feel intimidated.

Magician Teller established his persona of never speaking while performing to minimize heckling.

=== Controversies ===
Bill Burr's Philadelphia Incident was performed in Camden, New Jersey, where he reprimanded an audience of over ten thousand people. Michael Richards became upset with hecklers and called them the N-word several times. When a female audience member claimed that rape jokes are never funny, Daniel Tosh allegedly made an off-the-cuff retort that it would be funny if she were to be immediately raped.

== Movies and musicals ==
Screenings of The Rocky Horror Picture Show (as well as performances of The Rocky Horror Show) are continuously heckled by the audience by use of so-called callbacks or call backs. The funny and bold comments are sometimes 'traditional', that is, developed over decades including downloadable 'audience participation' heckling scripts. Many callbacks are spontaneous, regional and develop into heckling fights amongst the audience members or with either professional musical actors or audience members who perform the show in front of the screen.

== Other comedy mediums ==
The comedy TV series The Muppet Show featured a pair of hecklers named Statler and Waldorf. These characters created a kind of meta-comedy act in which the show's official comedian, Fozzie Bear, acted as their usual foil, although they occasionally made jokes at other characters as well.

Another notable use of heckling in comedy is in the cult favorite series Mystery Science Theater 3000. The series involves a man (either Joel Robinson, Mike Nelson or Jonah Heston) and two robots (Tom Servo and Crow T. Robot) sitting in a theater mocking bad B-movies. This style of comedy, coined as riffing, is continued with commentary-based series such as RiffTrax and Cinematic Titanic.

In one of Rowan Atkinson's plays, The School Master, a heckler interrupted his play by shouting "Here!" after Atkinson had read out an amusing name on his register. Atkinson incorporated it into his act by saying "I have a detention book..."

== See also ==
- Applause
- Audience participation
- Booing
- Internet troll
- Mystery Science Theater 3000, a TV show built on humorous heckling
