= Health problems of musicians =

Musicians can experience a number of health problems related to the practice and performance of music. The differences in career paths, occupations and performance scenarios are some of the determinants of a wide range of possible health effects.

== Health conditions ==
The most common injury type suffered by musicians is repetitive strain injury. A survey of orchestral performers found that 64–76% had significant repetitive strain injuries. Other types of musculoskeletal disorders, such as carpal tunnel syndrome and focal dystonia, are also common.

Non-musculoskeletal problems include:

- contact dermatitis,
- hearing problems due to exposure to loud music, such as tinnitus, hearing loss, hyperacusis and diplacusis,
- respiratory disorders or pneumothorax,
- increased intraocular pressure,
- gastroesophageal reflux disease, and
- psychological issues such as performance anxiety.

They are also at an increased risk of having problems with the stomatognathic system, in particular the mouth and teeth, which may in some cases lead to permanent injuries that prevent the musicians from playing.

There is little consistency across the hearing healthcare sector with respect to the care of musicians' hearing and the provision of hearing protection. However, the American Academy of Audiology has published a consensus document regarding best practices for hearing loss prevention with musicians.

Playing a brass or woodwind instrument puts the musician at greater risk of inguinal hernia. Woodwind instrumentalists, in rare cases, suffer a condition known as hypersensitivity pneumonitis, also referred to as saxophone lung, caused by Exophiala infection. It is held that this can occur if instruments are not cleaned properly.

The risks for disc jockeys working in nightclubs with loud music include noise-induced hearing loss and tinnitus. Nightclubs constantly exceed safe levels of noise exposure, with average sound levels ranging from 93.2 to 109.7 dB. Constant music exposure creates temporary and permanent auditory dysfunction for professional disk jockeys, with average levels at 96 dB, which is above the level at which ear protection is mandatory for industry. Three-quarters of disk jockeys have tinnitus and are at risk of tenosynovitis in the wrists and other limbs. Tenosynovitis results from staying in the same position over multiple gigs for scratching motion and cueing; this would be related to a repetitive strain injury. Gigs can last 4–5 hours in nightlife and the hospitality industry; as a result there are potential complications of prolonged standing which include slouching, varicose veins, cardiovascular disorders, joint compression, and muscle fatigue. It is also common for other staff to experience these, such as bartenders and security staff.

The World Health Organization launched the Make Listening Safe initiative as part of the celebration of World Hearing Day on 3 March 2015. WHO reviewed existing noise regulations for various entertainment sites – including clubs, bars, concert venues, and sporting arenas and released a global Standard for Safe Listening Venues and Events as part of World Hearing Day 2022.

== See also ==
- Performing arts medicine
- Safe-in-Sound Award
- Safe listening
- Hyperacusis
- Diplacusis
- 2023 concert abuse spate
