= Concert abuse in the 2020s =

Phenomenon at musical concerts

Concert abuse is a phenomenon attributed to the loss of concert etiquette between audience and performer. It has a long history, but experienced a resurgence in the 2020s decade after the COVID-19 pandemic lockdowns were lifted and audiences began to return and attend live concerts again. After social distancing began to dissipate in 2021, multiple performing artists became the victims of fan misbehavior.

Incidents include the cancellation of a concert and loss of ten lives in two separate events in October and November 2021 at the NRG Arena. Bad fan behavior has interfered with the performances of artists such as Dua Lipa, Harry Styles, Lady Gaga, Justin Bieber, Coldplay, the Killers, Miley Cyrus, Rubén Albarrán, Gerard Way, Maroon 5, Mac DeMarco, and Rosalía, among others. Artists have criticised fans for their lack of concert etiquette which endangers performers. Billie Eilish, Finneas O'Connell, Jason Derulo, Charlie Puth, Kelly Hansen, Tim McGraw, Chappell Roan, and John Mayer have all condemned the behavior.

The occupational hazards of performing on stage have been known since at least the 1760s, with historical spikes increasing in the 1950s. The post-pandemic decline in concert etiquette and rise in concert abuse in the 2020s is variously attributed to the effects of lockdowns, social media, misogyny, status symbolification, and artists' own on-stage behavior.

== Background ==
Concert audiences have a long history of abuse beginning in at least 1763, when an Artaxerxes audience revolted at the withdrawal of half-price tickets for those who came to the theatre after the main play to see the after-piece. In the 1840s, fans of Hungarian composer Franz Liszt engaged in outrageous behavior known as Lisztomania, which was considered a real contagious medical condition at the time. Audience misbehavior increased sharply in the 1950s. After George Harrison said that his favourite sweet was jelly babies, audiences threw jelly beans at his band the Beatles; similarly, from 1968 onwards, Tom Jones' audiences threw underwear at him on stage. In 1982, a fan threw a live bat at Ozzy Osbourne on stage. He thought it was made of rubber and bit its head off.

Many artists have suffered injuries while performing. In 2004, David Bowie had to pause a show after a projectile lollipop hit his eye, and in a separate incident, Dimebag Darrell was killed on-stage by an armed fan. In 2005, Pierre Bouvier was hospitalized after receiving a bottle to the eye at an Ovation Music Festival concert, prompting his band Simple Plan to cancel an appearance at ReAct Now: Music & Relief, and the following year, Brendon Urie was bruised and knocked out by a bottle at Reading Festival, resuming "The Only Difference Between Suicide and Martyrdom Is Press Coverage" after regaining consciousness. In 2010, Tila Tequila received a cut to the face that drew blood while performing at Gathering of the Juggalos, and later had the windows of her SUV smashed by an angry mob. In May 2013, Toots Hibbert went on a three-year break after developing anxiety, memory loss, headaches, dizziness, enochlophobia, and stage fright after a bottle hit him on the head at an American festival performance, for which the thrower was imprisoned for six months; and in 2016, Christina Grimmie was killed after a concert.

Some artists have made interacting with projectiles part of their act. Harry Styles, who had previously had tampons thrown at him while a member of One Direction, and who slipped on a splattered kiwifruit at a November 2017 Hammersmith Apollo concert (which caused a branch of Asda in Hulme to ban sales of kiwifruit to under 25s), would wear feather boas and cowboy hats and wave pride flags thrown by audience members. Meanwhile, artists such as Doja Cat, Olivia Rodrigo, and Billie Eilish would take fans' phones mid-concert and film themselves.

== Incidents ==
=== 2021 ===
After COVID-19 pandemic restrictions eased, live music attendance increased, including some first-time attendees. In October 2021, fans breaching security barriers outside NRG Arena caused a Playboi Carti concert to be cancelled, and on 5 November, at the same venue, fans surged toward the stage during Travis Scott's set, squeezing people so tightly together that they could not breathe or move their arms, resulting in ten deaths.

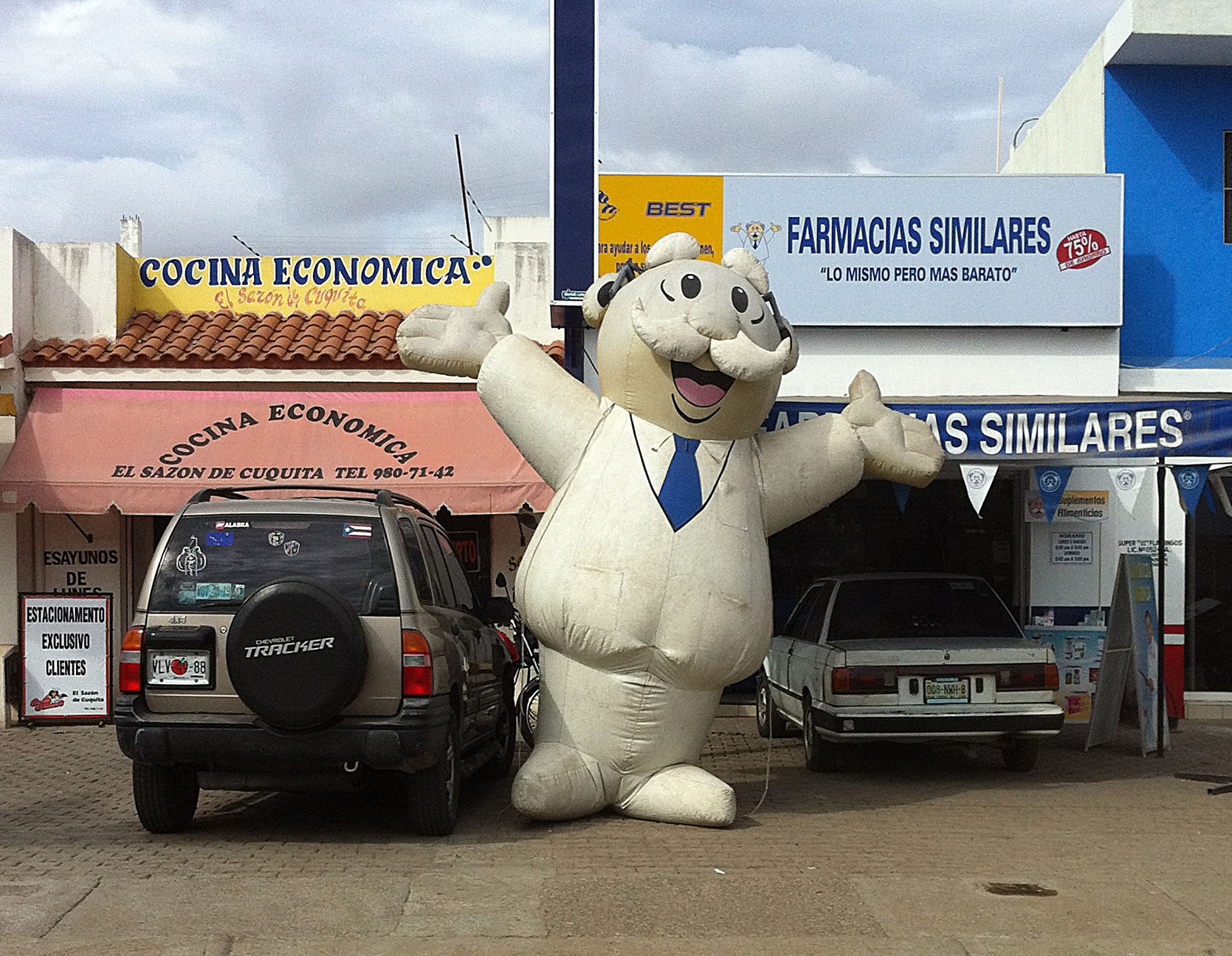
Dolls of the Dr. Simi character have been thrown at various artists.

In November 2021, a concertgoer at that year's Corona Capital festival passed a Dr. Simi doll through the crowd after seeing Aurora accept a bouquet of flowers and a card from a fan, a common custom amongst Mexican concertgoers. After she hugged the doll, the exchange went viral, prompting others to follow suit. Dua Lipa, Harry Styles, Lady Gaga, Justin Bieber, Coldplay, the Killers, Miley Cyrus, Rubén Albarrán, Gerard Way, Maroon 5, Mac DeMarco, and Rosalía had dolls thrown at them over the following fifteen months. Most were grateful, with Rosalía specifically requesting them, although Albarrán responded by biting its head off, and Gaga's fan base responded to a doll hitting her in the head with criticism for the launcher.

=== 2022 ===
In March 2022, videos of concertgoers sexually harassing Clairo during her performances of "Blouse" were posted online. The song's lyrics detail her experience being sexualized in the music industry. Shortly after the incident, she acquired a sinus infection and took the opportunity to take a break from performing in general, necessitating the rescheduling of several dates of her Sling Tour. In July, Kid Cudi ended a Rolling Loud Miami concert early after being bottled. In August, Harry Styles, a vegetarian, was hit by a flying chicken nugget at Madison Square Garden, prompting him to ask who threw it. He would later be hit in the testicles by a flying object in October 2022, attacked with Skittles the following month, and attacked with a rose in July 2023. In October 2022, Rosalía was hit in the face by a flying bouquet of roses, and later that month, Steve Lacy smashed an iPhone thrown at him. The following month, Piri & Tommy, who decorated their Froge.tour set with their signature frog decorations, had them stolen after a Leeds gig.

In December, Azealia Banks refused to play further concerts in Australia after having a bottle thrown at her, and Kehlani reported that a fan had sexually assaulted her as she left a concert. A crowd crush at an Asake concert at Brixton Academy caused the death of two concertgoers. Initially blamed on a ticketless mob, the crush was determined to be the result of security failures. In response, Lambeth London Borough Council closed the site, causing 44 acts to have to find alternative sites for their concerts.

=== 2023 ===
In April 2023, Kane Brown was hit in the testicles by an expensive projectile cowboy boot at an Intrust Bank Arena concert, shortly after he sung the line "I was in the wrong place at the wrong time" from his feature on Marshmello's "One Thing Right". Brown signed the boot and returned it to the audience member.

On 17 June 2023, an active Joint Base Lewis–McChord member killed two people after taking mushrooms at that year's Beyond Wonderland festival. The following day, a New Jersey man threw his cell phone at Bebe Rexha while she was performing her Best F*n Night of my Life Tour at Pier 17 in South Street Seaport, giving her a black eye and laceration. The assailant was arrested, charged, and arraigned for the attack. Two days later, a man jumped on stage and slapped Ava Max at a Fonda Theatre "On Tour (Finally)" concert, prompting the show's planned meet and greet to be delayed by an hour. She later revealed that the inside of her eye was scratched, and that the perpetrator would not be allowed at any of her other shows. On 24 June, Sexyy Red ended her performance at that year's Summer Smash festival early after having objects thrown at her; six days later, she would chastise an audience at Detroit's Wild Mustang Gentleman's Club for throwing money at her.

On 27 June 2023, on the first day of a two-day leg at BST Hyde Park, P!nk received a wheel of Brie, and the day after received the ashes of a fan's dead mother. Also on 28 June 2023, during the Idaho Botanical Garden leg of her Heartfelt tour, Kelsea Ballerini had a bracelet thrown at her during her, triggering her PTSD, and prompting her to go off stage and chastise the audience on her return.

On 1 July 2023, while performing at Lollapalooza in Sweden, a fan threw a fleshlight at Lil Nas X, leading him to quip "Who threw they pussy on stage?" and change his Twitter name to "Pussy" for the whole of 3 July.

On 5 July 2023, Drake had a phone thrown at him during his performance of Ginuwine's "So Anxious", during the United Center leg of his It's All a Blur Tour; throughout the tour, videos of Drake getting pelted with bras, and occasionally shoes and hats, surfaced on social media, prompting him to express deep disappointment at not having them thrown at a Montreal concert. A 36G bra thrown at him by a TikToker prompted the wearer to be offered an appearance in Playboy. By 12 August, bra-throwing had become such a regular occurrence at his concerts that he had to request attenders of that day's Show Court Arena concert not to, because his son, five years old at the time, was in the audience. The Game also had bras thrown at him, and 50 Cent expressed jealousy that he was not thrown bras. Drake also had a lemon-and-mint-flavoured electronic cigarette thrown at him on 20 July, prompting him to tell the audience member to do some "real life evaluating", a woman's purse thrown at him on 26 July, and one of his own poetry books thrown at him on 19 August, which he caught, and threatened that he would have "had to beat [the] ass" of the perpetrator had it hit him.

On 7 and 8 July 2023, Taylor Swift performed at Arrowhead Stadium in Kansas City as part of her Eras Tour. Concertgoers making and exchanging themed friendship bracelets were a trend at the tour due to the lyrics of Swift's song "You're on Your Own, Kid". While Swift was leaving the stadium after the show, some fans threw friendship bracelets at her, with one of them almost hitting Swift in the face, prompting her to duck, and for her security guards to scold the audiencegoer responsible. On 9 July, Latto had an object thrown at her, prompting her to threaten the concertgoer responsible with having their "ass beat", and on 29 July 2023, Roméo Elvis – who had taken a break from performing after being accused of unwanted touching – was pelted with stones at an Ecaussystème festival concert, prompting him to call his audience "junkyard dogs" and tell them to "aim better".

Also on 29 July 2023, in an incident caught on camera from multiple angles by several fans, Cardi B had water thrown at her face. Both she and her DJ had earlier requested that the audience "splash her pussy". She reacted to having water thrown at her by launching her microphone at the audience, prompting security to surround the perpetrator and retrieve it. The fact that her voice could still be heard caused her to face allegations of lip synching; in addition, a concertgoer later reported her for battery, a claim assessed by the Las Vegas Metropolitan Police Department but dropped for lack of evidence. The microphone was later auctioned by the owner of an audio equipment hire company, raising $99,900.

On 13 August, a fan threw her bra at Nick Jonas of the Jonas Brothers at a Yankee Stadium Jonas Brothers Five Albums. One Night. The World Tour concert. He would later have a wristband thrown at him at a Toronto concert on 19 August, prompting him to warn the thrower not to do that again, and several bracelets thrown at him on 11 September, prompting him to plead the audience to stop. On 31 August, at a Don Juan World Tour concert at Sacramento, California, Maluma caught a fan's projectile crutch and grinded on it, and on 21 September, a fan threw a phone at him, prompting him to break off from his performance to chastise the perpetrator.

In September 2023, a concertgoer urinated in the pit at a Death Grips concert in Philadelphia. The incident went viral online, and the perpetrator became known as the "Philadelphia Pisser".

On 13 October 2023, during the Death Grips tour stop at JJ's Live in Fayetteville, Arkansas, fans repeatedly threw glow sticks, and reportedly a phone, at the band. MC Ride was struck in the chest, threw his microphone to the ground and left the stage twice before the whole band abandoned the show about 25 songs into a reportedly 29-song set, with four songs left to play.

On 12 November, at an Eras Tour concert in Buenos Aires, Taylor Swift asked fans to not throw objects on stage after one landed next to her piano.

=== 2024 ===
On 20 April, as rapper Nicki Minaj was performing in Detroit as part of her Pink Friday 2 World Tour, an object was thrown at her; Minaj blocked the object with her hand, then picked it up and threw it back into the audience.

In November, Zach Bryan paused his concert in Tacoma, Washington when an object thrown onto the stage hit a guest, while in Pattaya, Thailand, Wiz Khalifa scolded a fan who threw money onto the stage. On 29 November, Kacey Musgraves was nearly grabbed and pulled into the crowd by a fan.

On 13 December, Billie Eilish was struck in the face mid-performance by an object thrown onto the stage.

=== 2025 ===
In October 2025, Eilish was again attacked when she was violently yanked into a concert crowd by an audience member.

== Causes ==
The abuse has been attributed to various causes. Writing in December 2022, Rachel Soloff of The Pitt News suggested that, having engaged with them via social media and Instagram Q&As, "fans may see these musicians as a peer rather than an artist who they don’t actually know", which led them to "believe that because they support an artist, they have to do exactly what the fans want and indulge their stupidity". She also blamed the status symbolification of attending concerts caused by "the exorbitant pricing of concert tickets", and singled out Ticketmaster and Bruce Springsteen for criticism. Writing in January 2023, Serena Smith of Dazed argued that new concert attendees did not know how to behave, and asserted that some fans had main character syndrome, while Cardiff University lecturer Dr. Lucy Bennett put forward the idea that fans might be forming parasocial relationships with their favourite artists, which could explain part of the problem.

Writing in February 2023, Madison Heydari of The Daily Reveille noted that the abuse was part of a decline in the general concert experience. The rise of the popularity of TikTok during the pandemic meant, Heydari explained, that some fans retained their "desire to video everything in hopes of capturing the perfect moment". Heydari argues that this fear of missing out (FOMO) made every aspect of attending concerts a competitive space, from purchasing tickets to finding the right clothing to wear. She also observed that at some concerts, fans would camp out for days and even weeks before the show. Once the concert began, the first five rows of concertgoers were often motionless to facilitate filming for posting on social media.

Some fans attributed the behavior to artists taking fans' phones mid-performance and filming themselves, with impatient fans wanting to be part of the action. Others blamed artists for throwing objects into the crowd; writing in June 2023, Alaina Demopoulous of The Guardian cited the examples of Axl Rose, who for decades was known for throwing his microphone into the crowd, only stopping in 2022 after an Australian fan received a black eye and broken nose; Chris Brown, who threw a fan's phone into the audience in March 2023 after objecting to being filmed while administering a lap dance; and Beyoncé, who had thrown her sunglasses into the crowd on 30 May 2023. Demopoulous also used her article to note that security concerns were focused more on crowd crushes following the Astroworld and the Seoul Halloween crowd crush incidents. Bob Brecht of live event production company TSE Entertainment proposed seating the crowd far enough away from the artist so that they could not reach them, but believed artists "would never stand for that, because they get a lot of their enthusiasm and excitement from a crowd".

Writing in July 2023, Joel Golby of The Guardian suggested it was a combination of three trends. One, "the elastic back-and-forth of fan and artist closeness that boomed during the peak of social media (and led to the current ferocious energy of stan culture)" beginning to regain "its controlled distance again" meant that fans were struggling to accept that their favourite artists were "letting someone from 'their team' do all their tweets and grid posts again". Two, with TikTok filled with comprehensive footage of prior gigs, Golby said fans needed another way of getting a unique experience. And three, Golby blamed fans for wanting to enter fans' lore books and for wanting to become a meme. Golby also pointed out that some artists were encouraging the latter, citing Charli XCX signing poppers and a douche during various 2019 meet-and-greets and Phoebe Bridgers commemorating being handed a sword by getting a tattoo of the event.

Writing in July 2023, crowd safety manager Paul Wertheimer argued that the abuse should be seen as part of a wider pattern that had cost Christina Grimmie and Dimebag Darrell their lives, and criticised "the industry" for not learning lessons from their deaths; Wertheimer also blamed post-lockdown aggression for the post-pandemic increase in threats against performers, and suggested that security could stand in the crowd instead of close to the stage to better address the problem. Carla Penna, psychoanalyst and crowd researcher, also blamed social media for eroding the borders between fans and artists. She noted misogyny as one possible cause, and suggested that "2½ years of lockdown and social distance" meant that "people changed their behavior, and many still feel uneasy in crowded or confined spaces".

== Responses ==
The assault on Harry Styles with Skittles prompted venues to stop allowing fans to bring gifts. Bebe Rexha started wearing protective eyewear during performances following her assault. Taylor Swift's fans created a concert etiquette guide.

DJ Zane Lowe asked fans to stop throwing things at artists. During a July 2023 show for her Weekends with Adele residency, Adele called on fans to "stop throwing things at the artist", and joked that she will "fucking kill" anyone who threw anything at her. Alicia Keys responded by installing her eight-year old son as a security guard, while Kelly Clarkson requested that concertgoers throwing objects at her throw diamonds; she later had a teddy bear thrown at her. Her diamonds remark was later praised by Kelsea Ballerini. Tyler, the Creator begged fans to "stop throwing [their] shit on stage", John Mayer requested that fans "please be kind", Charlie Puth responded by begging fans to "just enjoy the music", and Kelly Hansen chastised the "very, very dangerous" trend.

Jason Derulo responded by stating that the assaults "disrespect the artist", while Billie Eilish noted that people had been throwing things at her for six years and that it was "infuriating". Finneas O'Connell said that he understood fans' urges but pleaded them not to act on them. Tim McGraw said he was "used to soft goods being thrown at" him, but asked fans not to "throw anything that’s got any heft to it", as a premature concert ending due to injury "ruins the show for everybody". Corey Taylor found it dehumanising and blamed social media. Dave Mustaine, on the other hand, was unsympathetic, arguing that if the artists gave a good enough show, audiences would not feel the need to express disapproval.

== See also ==
- List of classical music concerts with an unruly audience response
