= Diplacusis =

Hearing disorder

Diplacusis, also known as diplacusis binauralis, binauralis disharmonica or interaural pitch difference (IPD), is a hearing disorder whereby a single auditory stimulus is perceived as different pitches between ears. It is typically experienced as a secondary symptom of sensorineural hearing loss, although not all patients with sensorineural hearing loss experience diplacusis or tinnitus. The onset is usually spontaneous and can occur following an acoustic trauma, for example an explosive noise, or in the presence of an ear infection. Sufferers may experience the effect permanently, or it may resolve on its own. Diplacusis can be particularly disruptive to individuals working within fields requiring acute audition, such as musicians, sound engineers or performing artists.

== Diplacusis of pure tones ==
The term diplacusis has been used in cases which people with unilateral cochlear hearing losses or asymmetrical hearing losses, the same tone presented alternately to the two ears may be perceived as having different pitches in the two ears. The magnitude of the shift can be measured by getting the subject to adjust the frequency of a tone in one ear until its pitch matches that of the tone in the other ear. On presentation of a single tone alternating between ears (i.e. 1000 Hz left, 1000 Hz right, 1000 Hz left, ...), a given person will consistently mismatch these sinusoids the same amount between trials if doing a pitch-matching task. For example, a 1000 Hz tone in an unaffected ear may be heard as a slightly different pitch in the opposite ear, or have an imperfect tonal quality in the affected ear.

== Biological explanation via theories of pitch of pure tones ==
There are two theories on the cause of diplacusis: place theory and temporal theory. Place theory posits that the cause is looking for the edge of the wave for the pitch and could explain diplacusis as a small differences between the two cochleas.

Temporal theory posits that the cause is from looking at the phase locking to tell what the pitch is. This theory has a difficult time explaining diplacusis. There are some examples of pitch which do not have an "edge" on the basilar membrane, which this would account for—e.g., white noise, clicks, etc. Both theories are under debate.

== Effects of sensorineural hearing loss ==
Normal human ears can discriminate between two frequencies that differ by as little as 0.2%. If one ear has normal thresholds while the other has sensorineural hearing loss (SNHL), diplacusis may be present, as much as 15–20% (for example 200 Hz one ear => 240 Hz in the other). The pitch may be difficult to match because the SNHL ear hears the sound "fuzzy". Bilateral SNHL gives less diplacusis, but pitch distortions may persist. This may cause problems with music and speech understanding.

== Treatment ==
Treatment of diplacusis includes a full medical and audiological examination that may explain the nature of the problem. If needed, amplification may relieve the symptoms of diplacusis. Therapy in helping the patient understand the cause of the symptom and tinnitus retraining may provide some relief. In at least some cases, amplification makes no difference and there is no treatment other than waiting for natural resolution. Some individuals may find the provided amplification also increases the audibility of their pitch discrepancy. If onset is linked to an underlying medical cause, i.e. sudden sensorineural hearing loss, appropriate medical treatment is recommended.

== Etymology ==
Diplacusis is from the Greek words "diplous" (double) and "akousis" (hearing).

== See also ==
- Audiology
- Health problems of musicians
- Hearing
- Hearing loss
- Pitch (psychophysics)
- Auditory system
- Safe listening

== External sources ==
- Diplacusis: I. Historical Review
- Turner, Christopher. "Perception of Pitch." Wendell Johnson Speech and Hearing Center, Iowa City. Dec. 2008.
- Plack et al. (ed.). Pitch : Neural coding and perception. Springer. 2005.
- Diplacusis.com - discussion with skew graphs
