= Musician =

Person who composes, conducts or performs music

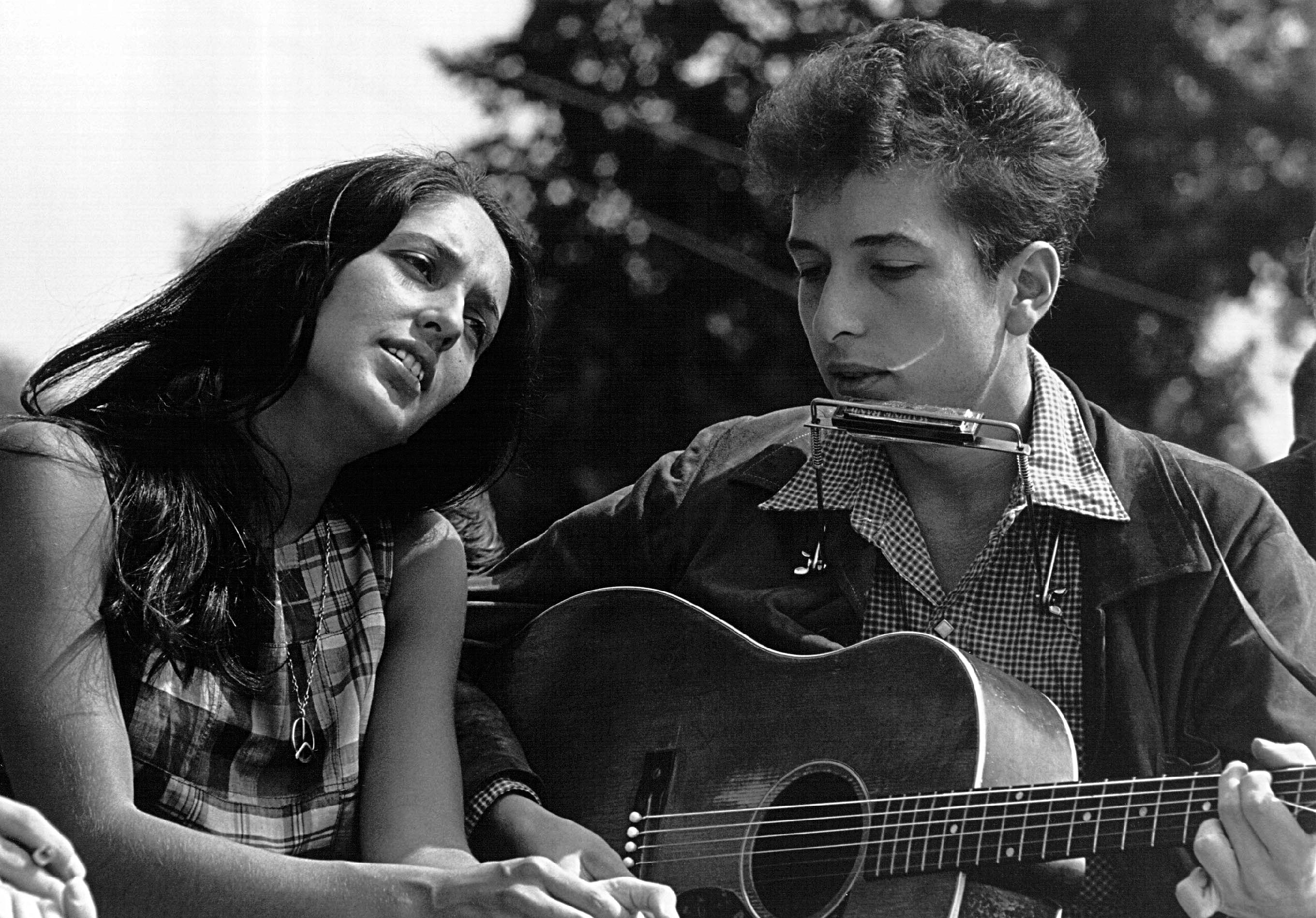
American musicians Joan Baez and Bob Dylan performing at the March on Washington in 1963.

A musician is someone who composes, conducts, or performs music, especially instrumental music. According to the United States Employment Service, "musician" is a general term used to designate a person who follows music as a profession. Musicians include songwriters, who write both music and lyrics for songs; conductors, who direct a musical performance; and performers, who perform for an audience. A music performer is generally either a singer (also known as a vocalist), who provides vocals, or an instrumentalist, who plays a musical instrument. Musicians may perform on their own or as part of a group, band or orchestra.

Musicians may specialize in a musical genre, although many perform across a variety of styles and often blend or cross genres. Their musical output is influenced by a range of factors, including culture, skill set, life experience, education, and creative preferences. A musician who records and releases music is often referred to as a recording artist; while a musician who primarily writes and records art music, media soundtracks, and scores—including for films, theatrical stage productions, and video games—or classical music is usually called a composer. A music producer, while not a musician outright, may themselves be a musician. A conductor, by way of gestures, leads and provides live direction for, or conducts, an ensemble, typically an orchestra or choral group.

== Types ==
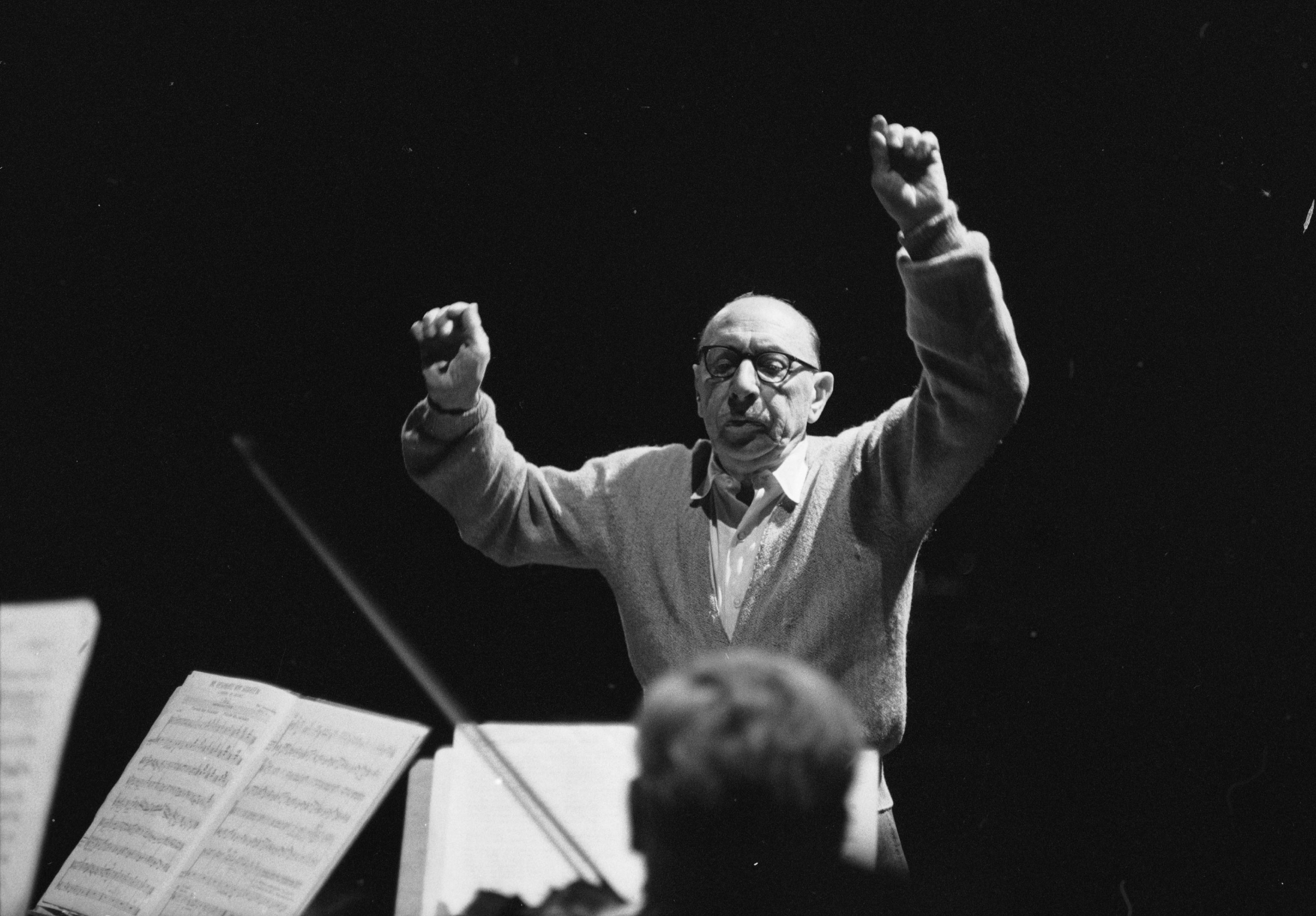
Russian composer Igor Stravinsky conducting in Zurich, 1961.

=== Composer ===
A composer is a musician who creates musical compositions. The title is principally used for those who write classical music or film music. Those who write the music for popular songs may be called songwriters. Those who mainly write the words for songs may be referred to as lyricists.

=== Conductor ===
A conductor directs a musical performance; conducting has been defined as "the art of directing the simultaneous performance of several players or singers by the use of gesture". The conductor stands on a raised podium and communicates with the musicians through hand gestures or eye contact.

=== Performer ===
Examples of performers include, but are not limited to, instrumentalists and singers who perform for an audience. A musician can perform as a solo artist or as a part of an ensemble (e.g. an orchestra, a choir or a pop group).

=== Producer ===
A music producer plays a crucial role in shaping the sound of an album or song, overseeing the recording process, and guiding the overall creative direction. They often collaborate closely with artists, musicians, sound engineers, and other industry professionals.

== See also ==
- Health problems of musicians
- List of online music databases
- Lists of musicians
- Record producer
- Record sales
- Singing
- Songwriter
