= Claque =

Body of professional applauders in French theatres and opera houses

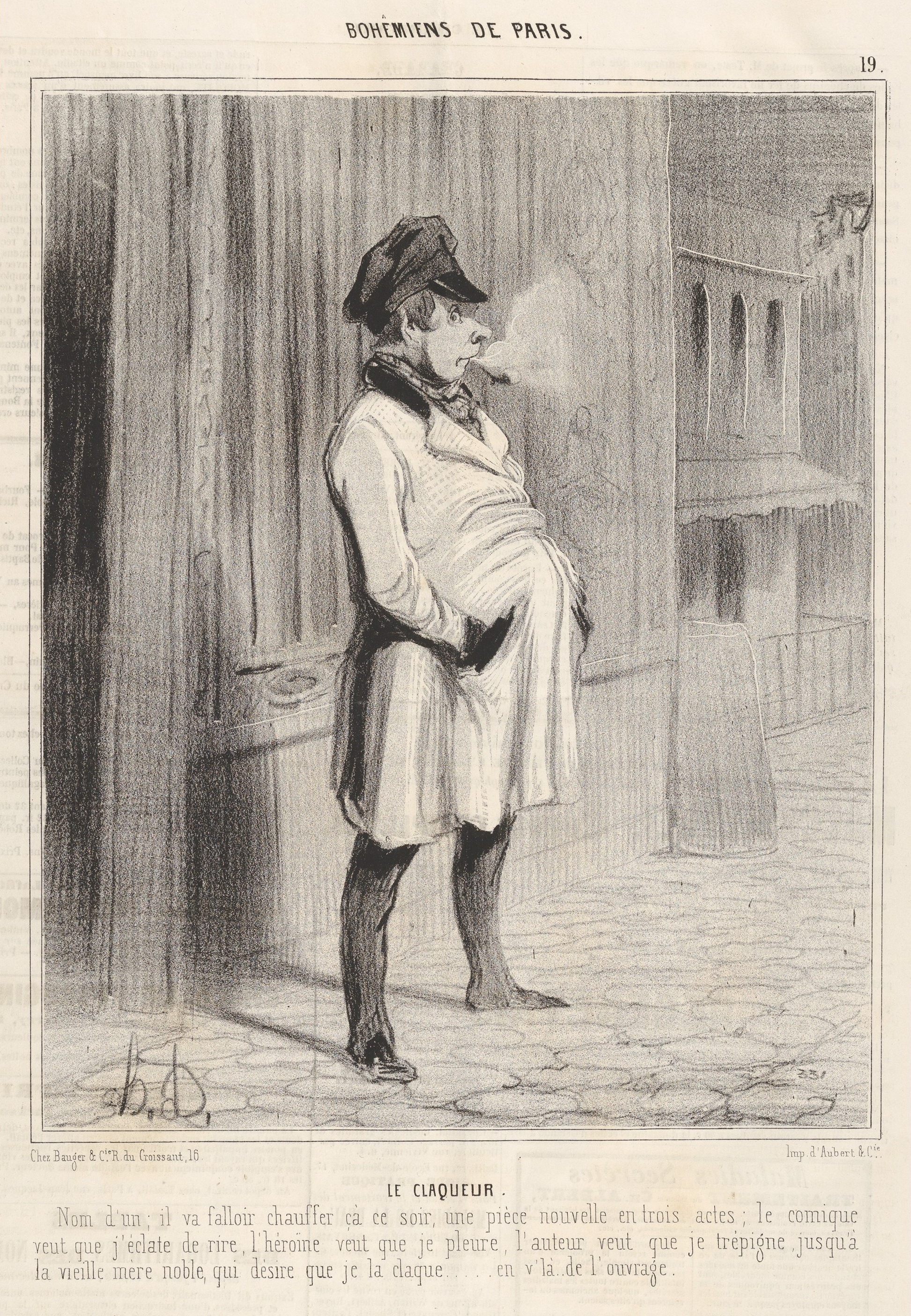
Le claqueur by Honoré Daumier, 1842

A claque is an organized body of professional applauders in French theatres and opera houses. Members of a claque are called claqueurs.

== History ==
Hiring people to applaud dramatic performances was common in classical times. For example, when the Emperor Nero acted, he had his performance greeted by an encomium chanted by five thousand of his soldiers.

The recollection of this gave the 16th-century French poet, Jean Daurat, an idea which has developed into the modern claque. Buying up a number of tickets for a performance of one of his plays, Daurat distributed them to people who promised to give him applause. In 1820 claques underwent serious systematization when an agency in Paris opened to manage and supply claqueurs.

By 1830 the claque had become an institution. The manager of a theatre or opera house could send an order for any number of claqueurs. These usually operated under a chef de claque (leader of applause), who judged where the efforts of the claqueurs were needed and initiated the demonstration of approval. This could take several forms. There would be commissaires ("officers/commissioner") who learned the piece by heart and called the attention of their neighbors to its good points between the acts. Rieurs (laughers) laughed loudly at the jokes. Pleureurs (criers), generally women, feigned tears, by holding their handkerchiefs to their eyes. Chatouilleurs (ticklers) kept the audience in a good humor, while bisseurs (encore-ers) simply clapped and cried "Bis! Bis!" to request encores.

The practice spread to Italy (famously at La Scala, Milan), Vienna, London (Covent Garden) and New York City (the Metropolitan Opera). Claques could be used in a form of extortion: writers or singers were commonly contacted by a chef de claque before a debut and forced to pay a fee or have their work booed.

Richard Wagner withdrew a staging of his opera Tannhäuser from the Parisian operatic repertory after the claque of the Jockey Club derisively interrupted its initial performances in March 1861.

Later Arturo Toscanini and Gustav Mahler discouraged claques, as a part of the development of concert etiquette.

Although the practice mostly died out during the mid- to late-20th century, instances of actors paid to applaud at performances still occasionally appear, most famously with the Bolshoi Ballet.

== See also ==
- Astroturfing
- Cheerleading
- Kakegoe
- Laugh track
- ōmukou (ja:大向う) – case of Kabuki
- Payola
- Professional mourning
- Shill
- Social proof
- Tifosi
