= Performing arts medicine =

Performing arts medicine is a branch of medicine that emerged in the late 20th century. It deals with injuries and the prevention of injuries to performing artists, particularly musicians and dancers.

Performing arts medicine is an outgrowth of occupational and physical medicine concerned with the medical complaints of musicians, dancers, actors and other performing artists. Medical issues can range from pain in performance to neuro-muscular dysfunction or psychological problems related to performance. The awkward positions and repetitive motions commonly required of performing artists can lead to these and other problems. Medical problems related to performance are common among musicians: according to a 1987 survey of musicians, "Eighty-two percent said they experienced a medical problem, either physical or psychological, and 76 percent said it was severe enough to interfere with their work."

The first survey of medical problems of performing artists is in the 1713 treatise Diseases of Workers by Bernardino Ramazzini. More recently, Diseases of the Music Profession: A Systematic Presentation of Their Causes, Symptoms and Methods of Treatment, by Kurt Singer, was translated into English in 1932. Performing arts medicine began to take an organizational shape in the 1980s, with the first annual symposium on the topic in 1983, at the request of the Aspen Music Festival. A peer-reviewed journal, Medical Problems of Performing Artists, began publication in 1986, edited by Alice Brandfonbrener. It is published by Science & Medicine with sponsorship by the Performing Arts Medicine Association (PAMA) and the Australian Society for Performing Arts Healthcare (ASPAH). A textbook, now titled Performing Arts Medicine, has been published in successive editions, most recently in 2010. The Performing Arts Medicine Association was founded in 1988.

== See also ==
- Health problems of musicians
- Occupational therapy
- Physical therapy
- Physiatry
- Repetitive strain injury
