= Hear, hear =

Expression

Hear, hear is an expression which represents a listener's agreement with the point being made by a speaker or in response to a toast.

== Origins ==
The phrase hear him, hear him! was used in Parliament from late in the 17th century, and was reduced to hear! or hear, hear! by the late 18th century. The verb hear had earlier been used in the King James Bible as a command for others to listen.

Other phrases have been derived from hear, hear, such as a hear, hear (a cheer), to hear-hear (to shout the expression), and hear-hearer (a person who does the same).

== Usage ==
It was originally an imperative for directing attention to speakers, and has since been used, according to the Oxford English Dictionary, as "the regular form of cheering in the House of Commons", with many purposes, depending on the intonation of its user. Its use in Parliament is linked to the fact that applause is normally (though not always) forbidden in the chambers of the House of Commons and House of Lords. It is also used in other parliaments established in the Westminster tradition, such as Australia and Canada.

== See also ==
The dictionary definition of hear, hear at Wiktionary
