= Applause sign =

Diagnostic test for neurodegenerative disease

The applause sign is a behavioural indicator, relevant to neurodegenerative conditions, characterised by a patient's inability to execute the same number of hand claps as demonstrated by an examiner.

== Background ==
The applause sign was first described by Dubois and colleagues in 1995, as "a simple test of motor control that helps to differentiate Progressive supranuclear palsy (PSP) from frontal or striatofrontal degenerative diseases", but has since appeared in various neurodegenerative conditions involving frontal lobe dysfunction.

The applause sign is identified by the three-clap test (TCT), where the patient is asked 'to clap three times as quickly as possible after demonstration'. The subject shows the applause sign when they fail to clap three times, usually continuing past 3. PSP patients are most common displayers of the sign, with occasional appearances in individuals with corticobasal degeneration, Parkinson's disease, amyotrophic lateral sclerosis, frontotemporal dementia and Alzheimer's disease.

== Indicative uses and mechanisms ==
=== Frontal lobe dysfunction ===
The applause sign can indicate frontal lobe dysfunction because deliberate movement functions are localised to the brain's frontal lobe, meaning all control of deliberate movement like clapping is the responsibility of frontal lobe structures. Hence, when the frontal lobe functions abnormally, an inability to execute movement according to intention results.

Ability to stop actions as and when intended is a process key to the applause sign, and to which voluntary movement control is integral. The inferior frontal gyrus is the specific part of the frontal lobe responsible for generating stop processes. Hence, when a patient experiences frontal lobe dysfunction, the inferior frontal gyrus is impacted, resulting in movement perseveration (an abnormal prolongation of current activity), and appearance of the applause sign.

Higher frequency of the applause sign in severe than mild and moderate Alzheimer's evidences this mechanism, with frontal lobe dysfunction only a feature of severe cases. FMRI studies in healthy participants also show increased activity in the frontal lobe during stop-signal tasks similar to the TCT.

=== Basal ganglia dysfunction ===
The applause sign can also reflect dysfunction of the subthalamic nucleus (STN) and pallidum, two structures involved in function of the basal ganglia (a small group of brain structures involved in voluntary movement control networks).

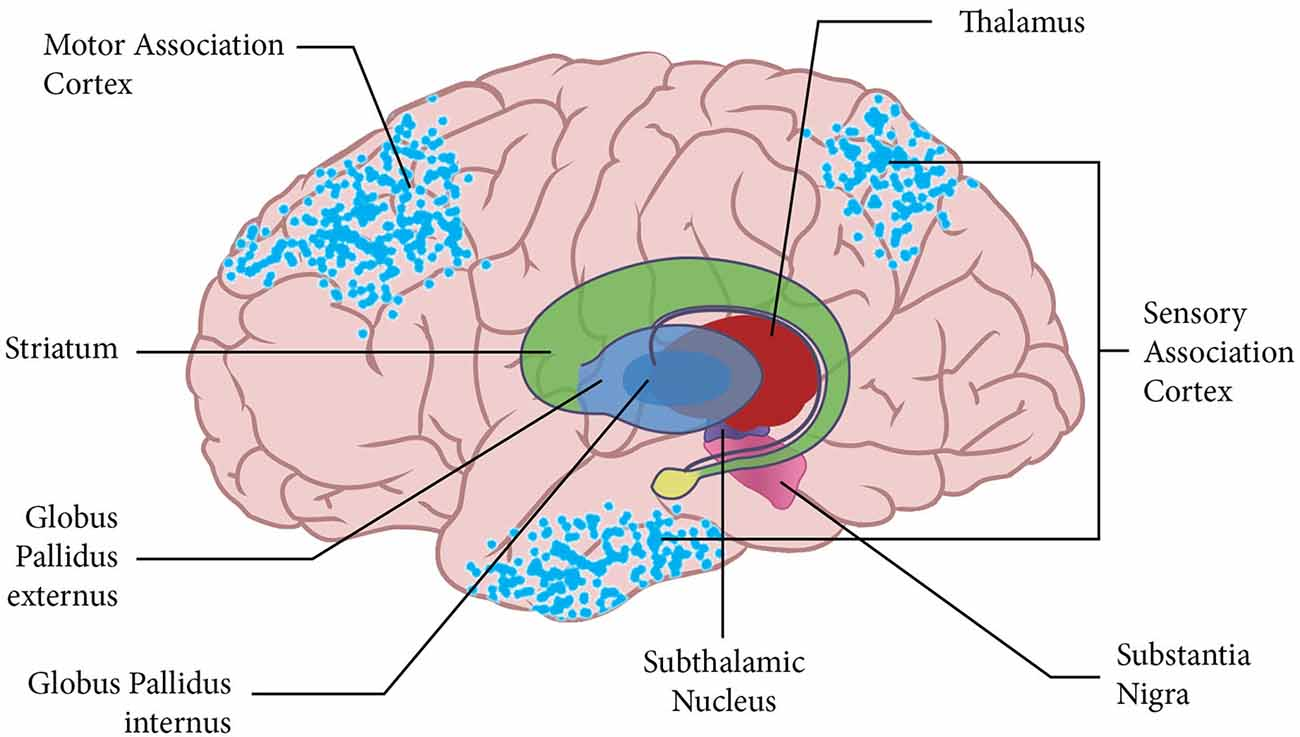
The basal ganglia and its relevant substructures

Normal function of the STN prevents unwanted movement through its influence in the basal ganglia. It stimulates the pallidum to decrease activity in the thalamus, another structure implicated in movement control, which decreases movement. When the STN is dysfunctional, unwanted movements such as additional claps go unprevented, and the applause sign appears.

This mechanism is supported by correlation between TCT scores and high scores from a test of basal ganglia dysfunction (UPDRS part III).

=== Combined mechanism (Frontalstriatal disconnection syndrome) ===
One study proposes a combined mechanism, involving both the basal ganglia and the inferior frontal gyrus.

When basal ganglia pathways are dysfunctioning, the inferior frontal gyrus and other motor preparation areas stop receiving normal input from the basal ganglia about when to stop preparing and executing observed actions. This results in continuous activity in this imitation processing circuitry. Hence, we observe an inability to stop imitation of claps when desired during the TCT.

This mechanism may reflect increased prevalence of the sign in PSP patients, since PSP is associated with damage to both the frontal lobe and basal ganglia structures simultaneously. It may also explain why the sign appears regardless of if the individual's condition is predominantly frontal or predominantly subcortical (the level of the basal ganglia).

== List of conditions associated with frequent appearance ==
- Progressive supranuclear palsy
- Parkinson's disease
- Corticobasal degeneration and syndrome
- Alzheimer's disease
- Frontotemporal dementia
- Amyotrophic lateral sclerosis (ALS)

== Evidence of clinical effectiveness ==
=== As a test of neurodegenerative disorder ===
The applause sign has been able to identify patients with neurodegenerative conditions from healthy controls at 100% success rate.

=== When identifying PSP ===
Separating PSP patients and healthy controls using the sign had a mean success rate of 64.7% across 4 known studies, effectiveness as high as 85% in one.

Appearance of the sign, when used in conjunction with 4 classical parkinsonian disease findings, enables highly accurate PSP diagnosis.

=== When identifying FTD ===
One study reported the sign as present in 80% of patients with the disinhibited subtype of the behavioral variant of FTD (bvFTD).

=== As a test of executive function ===
TCT scores show correlation with Stroop test scores and performance on the Initiation/Preservation task of the Dementia rating scale results, which are both common measures of executive function.

=== As part of a combined test of cognitive impairment ===
A Rapid Cognitive Screen Test (RCS-T), combined with a triple test of the applause and two other signs, appears effective in identifying specific cognitive impairment.

== Criticisms ==
=== Lacking specificity ===
The applause sign is detectable in any condition impacting the frontal lobe, so it often fails to discriminate between neurodegenerative conditions, including PSP from parkinsonian disorders, and CBD from MSA. The applause sign is also present in 72% of patients with any form of cognitive impairment, regardless of whether this is mild cognitive impairment (MCI) or dementia.

Additionally, it may also reflect only certain condition subtypes, rather than all forms: in one study, prevalence of applause sign was 63% in atypical parkinsonism and only 29% in typical PD. Another reported the occurrence of the sign in cortical dementias patients as 10%, but a much higher 39% in cortico-subcortical dementia patients.

The applause sign also fails to discriminate between individuals who clap more and individuals who clap less than 3 times, sometimes called a non-applause sign. Both of these demonstrate an applause sign, but which of these response categories they fall into changes the dysfunctional motor initiative responsible for failure.

The applause sign's non-specificity may make it more appropriate as part of wider diagnostic framework, or as an observational clue, similar to glabellar, masseter, and palmomental signs in parkinsonian disorders.

=== Contradictory evidence from Alzheimer's research ===
One study finds no correlation between results of a test of motor behaviour (Luria motor sequence) and the applause sign. If the applause sign demonstrates motor disruption as theorised, then this presents significant opposition to that claim.

This criticism has been downplayed on the basis that applause sign exclusively reflects motor perseveration and therefore association to performance in motor planning and execution tests is unlikely.

=== Lack of published research ===
22 distinct studies exist on the applause sign and its effectiveness. Within this, only 129 PSP patients have been examined across 6 studies, including one sample of only 5. Relation to CBD is based on 2 studies sampling 2 and 9 participants. Small sample sizes hugely reduce generalisability of findings. Further studies about the diagnostic properties of the applause sign must come forward to clarify its practical value and specific role as a sign of frontostriatal disconnection.
