= Wang Wenyi =

American journalist

- Born: 26 October 1958; Changchun, Jilin, China
- Education: Jilin University; University of Chicago
- Occupations: pathologist, journalist, Activist, Academic teaching faculty

Dr. Wang Wenyi (Chinese: 王文怡; pinyin: Wáng Wényí; born 26 October 1958 in Changchun, Jilin, China) is a pathologist who once worked as a journalist for The Epoch Times. She is known for having confronted Jiang Zemin, General Secretary of the Chinese Communist Party in 2001, and protested for the forced organ harvesting in China with General Secretary Hu Jintao on 20 April 2006 in White House. According to press reports, she was protesting against Communist China's human rights abuse especially the organ harvesting from living Falun Gong practitioners.

== Biography ==
Dr. Wang Wenyi is a Chinese national who graduated as a medical doctor from the Norman Bethune University of Medical Sciences, now part of Jilin University, China in 1983; holds a PhD in pharmacology and Physiology from the University of Chicago, and completed her residency as a pathologist at New York City's Mount Sinai Hospital. Currently, Dr Wenyi Wang is teaching biomedical sciences in a private school as an educator.

She is a mother of two, a naturalised U.S. citizen who has lived in the United States for 20 years of her life, and who worked as a journalist for the Epoch Times, where she specialized in medical issues since about 2000. Wang had helped research Epoch Times articles on organ harvesting.

=== Protests ===
In 2001, she penetrated a security cordon in Malta during a visit of former General Secretary of the Chinese Communist Party Jiang Zemin and asked him to stop persecuting Falun Gong practitioners inside China. Again, in April 2006, during CCP General Secretary Hu Jintao's visit to the United States, she used her journalist pass to gain access to a White House lawn press briefing. She unfurled protest banners and loudly shouted for over two minutes, by some accounts, during a speech given by Chinese leader.

She shouted comments such as "President Bush, stop him from killing" or "President Hu, your days are numbered". Secret Service ushered Wang away from the media platform. Wang's attorney stated that there was no evidence Hu heard the statements uttered, claiming that the scuffles to take away her banner and the attempt to silence her could have caused Hu to pause in his remarks. CNN and BBC feeds of Hu's visit were interrupted by state censors in China, blacking out the protester's action.

The Epoch Times reported that Wang helped research articles on organ harvesting at Sujiatun Thrombosis Hospital. She was "very overstressed," Epoch Times said, "When she saw Bush shake the hand of the Chinese leader, she felt obligated to speak out". At the time of the protest, she was not a US citizen, and could have faced deportation.

After spending the night in jail, Wang was formally charged on 21 April 2006 with "knowingly and wilfully intimidating, coercing, threatening or harassing ... a foreign official performing his duties," a misdemeanor punishable by up to six months in prison and a fine of $5,000. Bush apologised to the Chinese for the protest incident; Epoch Times also made an apology to the US president. Outside diplomatic circles, there were also opposite reactions to the protest in some media.

Wang said to reporters: "What I did was say just a few words at a moment in history. It was an act of conscience and an act of civil disobedience." She was released on 21 April 2006, without bail pending further proceedings. She was charged with disorderly conduct; on 21 June 2006, the U.S. Court in Washington D.C. dropped all charges against Wang. Two weeks later on 16 May 2006, Wang attended a media conference at the National Press Club with two recently released Falun Gong prisoners by her side to once again accuse China of secret organ harvesting.

Wang Wenyi's protest was reported in many international media including CNN, ABC, The New York Times, New York Post, The Washington Post, and The Washington Times, among others. In an 22 April editorial, The Washington Post reportedly opined, "There's no question that it ... caused Mr. Bush to be embarrassed about a lapse of protocol for a visitor acutely sensitive to diplomatic niceties. OK, but the United States shouldn't indirectly apologize to the Chinese by means of an action that affronts American values". The Washington Times made a "Nobles and knaves" editorial article about her.

Three international Chinese dissidents and attorneys announced that they would like to come to the United States to defend her and support her. Those people included attorneys Gao Zhisheng, Zhang Jiankang, and Yang Zaixin. However their applications for passports were denied by Chinese authorities.

On 6 December 2006, Wang Wenyi was among the ten Chinese dissidents awarded with the 2006 "Hero of Freedom" Award from the Asia-Pacific Human Rights Foundation.

After multiple hearings, the "Falun Gong Protection Act" (H.R. 4132), passed unanimously by the U.S. House of Representatives on June 25, 2024, focuses on addressing forced organ harvesting in the People's Republic of China, specifically targeting the persecution of Falun Gong practitioners. USA Congressional Bill, H.R.4132 - Falun Gong Protection Act, June 25, 2024
