= Concert etiquette =

Set of social norms for concertgoers

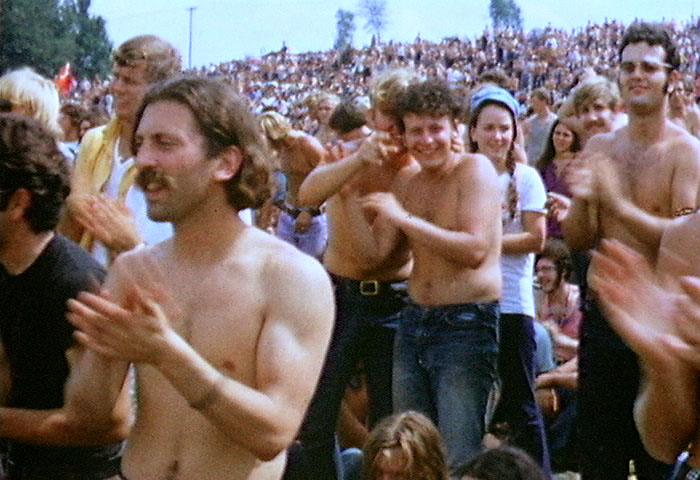
Part of the audience at Woodstock, observing concert etiquette which is suitable for an open-air rock concert

Concert etiquette refers to a set of social norms observed by those attending musical performances. These norms vary depending upon the type of music performance and can be stringent, with dress codes and conduct rules, or relaxed and informal. The rules or expectations for concert etiquette may be informally communicated by word-of-mouth by attendees or participants or they may be printed on tickets or signs.

== Genres ==
=== Classical music ===
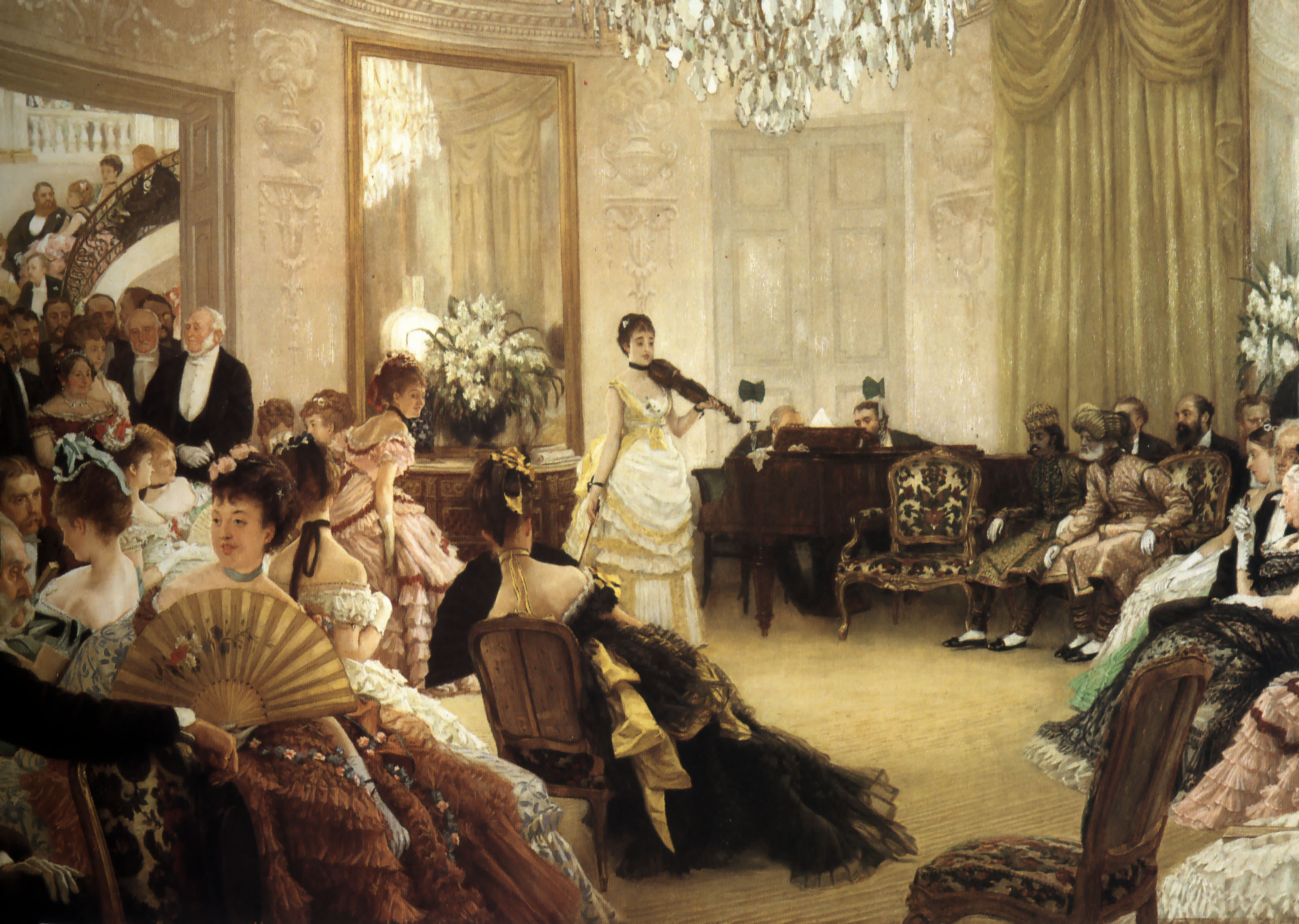
Hush! by James Tissot (c. 1895) depicts the moments before a concert.

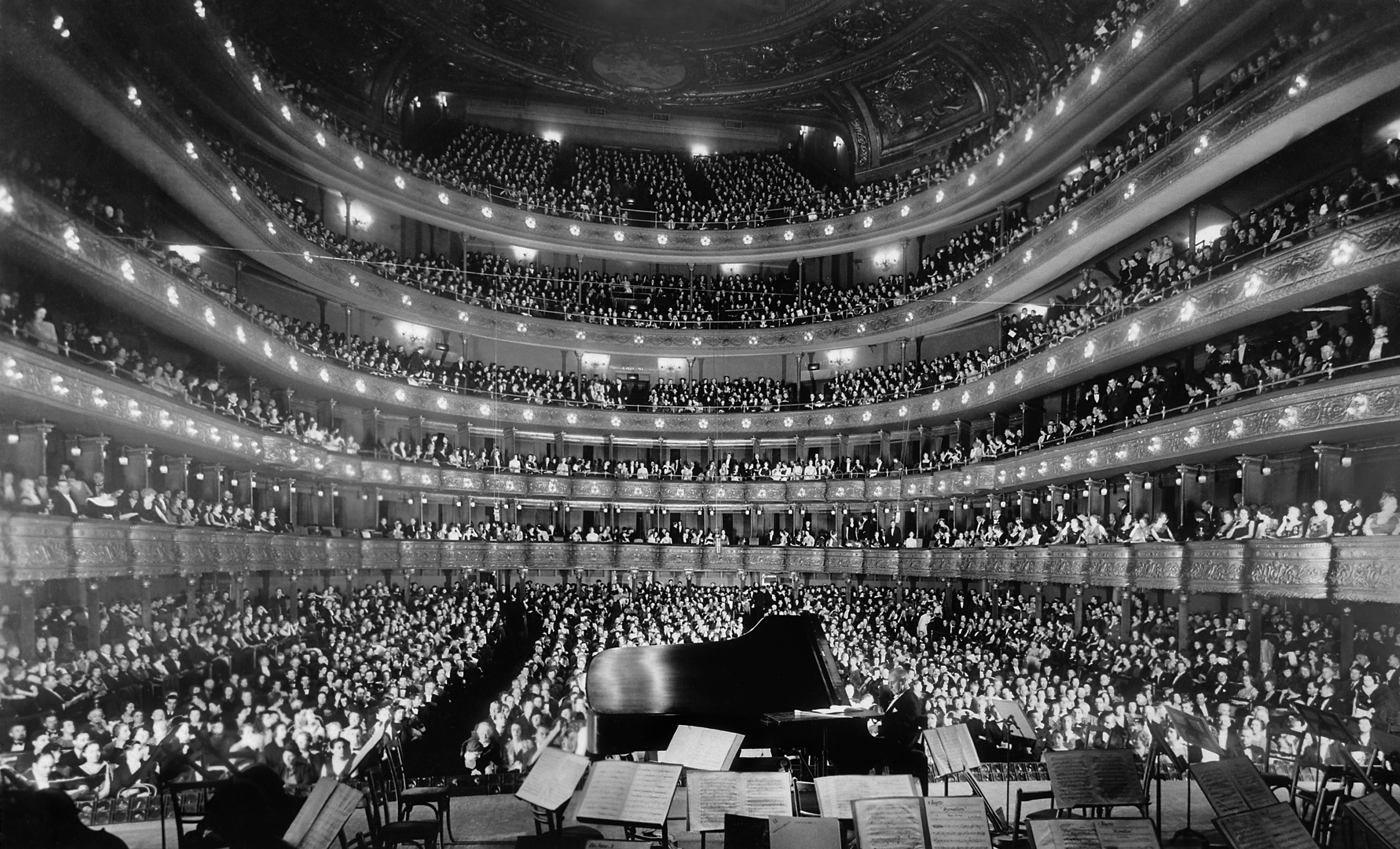
Metropolitan Opera House in a concert by pianist Josef Hofmann with a symphony orchestra in 1937.

At classical music concerts, the cardinal principle is to let others listen to the music undisturbed. Instruments and voices are typically unamplified, and the music is rich in detail and includes passages played very softly. Many audience members want to hear everything, and the normal standard of courtesy is simply to be entirely silent while the music is playing. Thus, during this time experienced concertgoers avoid conversation, try to suppress coughs and sneezes, muffling these with handkerchiefs. Electronic devices are turned off. Concertgoers try to arrive and take seats before the music begins; late arrivals wait until a break between pieces allows seating by an usher.

Dress expectations for the audience are today rather informal in English-speaking countries. Audiences usually meet "smart casual" standards, with some performance companies explicitly telling audiences to wear whatever makes them comfortable. Hats are removed as they block others' view of the stage. Dress expectations may still be very formal for special events, events that are difficult to attend, or that take place in traditional venues. Additionally, concertgoers are expected to dress more formally in certain countries than in others.

Concert etiquette has, like the music, evolved over time. Late eighteenth-century composers such as Mozart expected that people would talk, particularly when audience members took dinner (which many had served during the performance), and took delight in audiences clapping at once in response to a nice musical effect. Individual movements were encored in response to audience applause. Robert Bedont notes that “Mozart...would have expected food, drink, gossip, and a rowdy 18th-century crowd.”

The nineteenth century brought a shift in venue from aristocratic gatherings to public concerts along with works featuring an unprecedentedly wide dynamic range. Mahler clamped down on claques paid to applaud a particular performer, and specified in the score of his Kindertotenlieder that its movements should not be punctuated by applause.

With the arrival of recording technology in the twentieth century, applause between the movements of a symphony or suite came to be regarded as a distraction from the momentum and unity of a work. Bedont states that “...with Wagner and Mahler insisting on attentive listening and the background silence of 20th-century recording studios, audience noise has come to be viewed as intrusive to the performers and patrons alike.”

In the 2020s, applause between movements is usually considered something of a faux pas, though a minor and well-meaning one.

Sacred works offered as worship are not applauded. Such works include settings of requiem, Passion, mass, or Kaddish prayer. Presented in an artistic context, such works, along with secular works of comparable gravity, still often get respectful silence for a long moment before any applause.

Collapses of decorum have occurred often in music history. In 1861 a Paris performance of Richard Wagner's opera Tannhäuser was deliberately sabotaged by audience members bringing noisemakers. The premiere of Stravinsky's ballet The Rite of Spring in 1913 prompted catcalls and whistles from the crowd that degenerated into fistfights in the aisles and police intervention. Steve Reich's Four Organs at Carnegie Hall in 1973 featured audience members sarcastically applauding and shouting to hasten the end of the performance. Conductor Michael Tilson Thomas recalls a woman walking down the aisle and beating her head against the front of the stage, and making negative comments implying that she was being tortured by the music.

Kate Molleson states that the “classical music community gives mixed messages”, as “[a]ccessibility is the industry catchword” (e.g., concert venues encourage casual attire), and yet audiences “demand sanctimonious listening environments of silence and absolute stillness” in classical venues, which “alienates those not in the know.”

=== Jazz ===
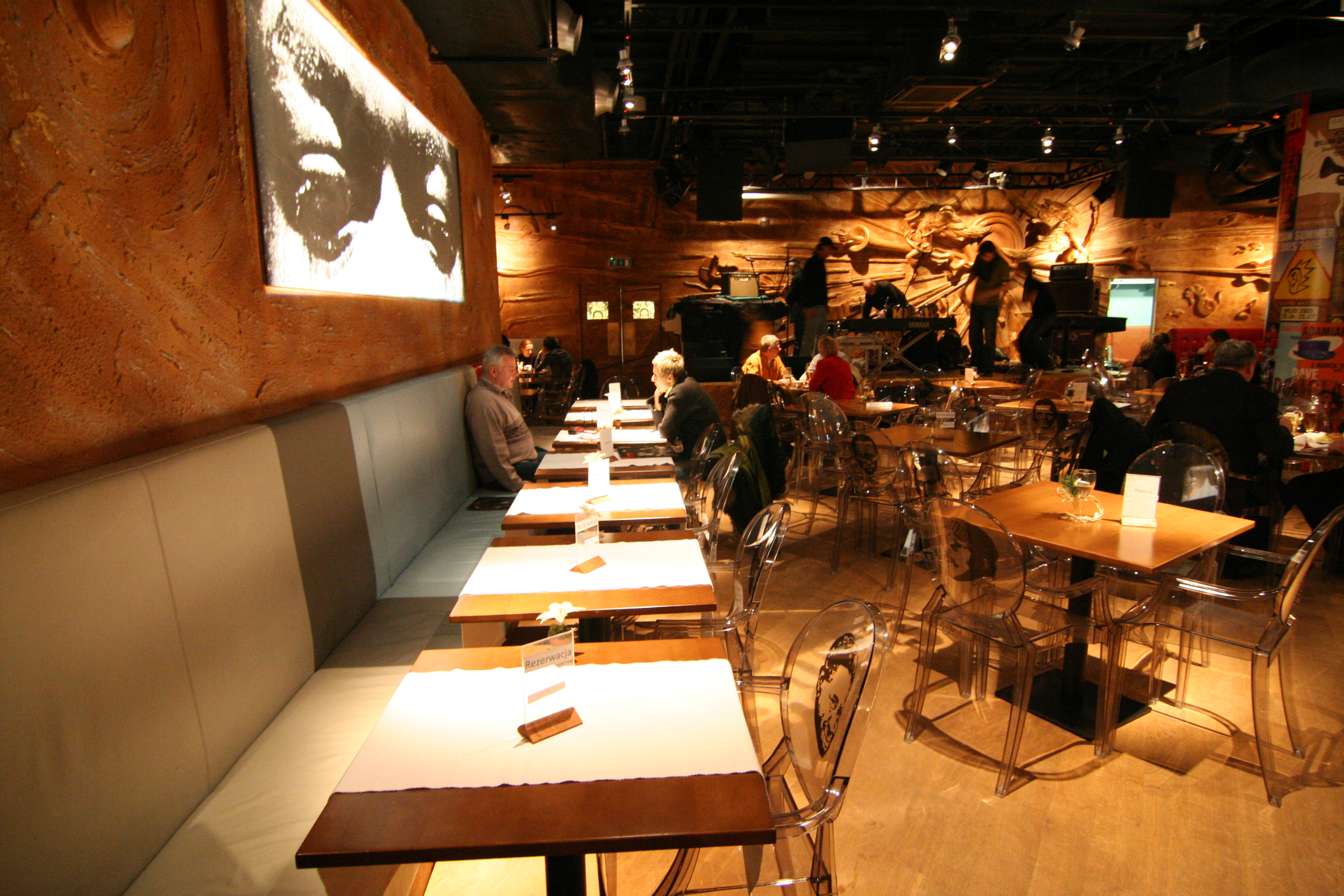
Akwarium Jazz Club in Warsaw has tables in the middle of the venue and bench-style seats.

Jazz clubs are as much a social event as they are a musical one, with clubs featuring seats around tables rather than a more traditional line of seats, beverages (alcoholic and non-alcoholic) and in some cases, restaurant meals are served in clubs. The clubs are generally intimate, small buildings with seats spaced close together with the stage never too far away. Discussion between audience members is common, so long as it does not distract other listeners from the music, with the energy of the audience even potentially bringing out more from the performers.

Performers are even expected to engage with the audience more closely, relying on their reactions to form their performance. Audience members take note of the interactions between performers, such as cues and encouraging gestures, despite not always knowing ahead how the improvised performance will be laid out. With regards to applause, the audience usually claps after each solo within the jazz tune in order to recognize the soloist. As well, the audience may applaud and cheer at the end of a song. This type of engagement is common throughout jazz performances regardless of the setting and shares the same basic ideas as other clapping procedures: show appreciation for the musicians’ efforts.

=== Rock ===
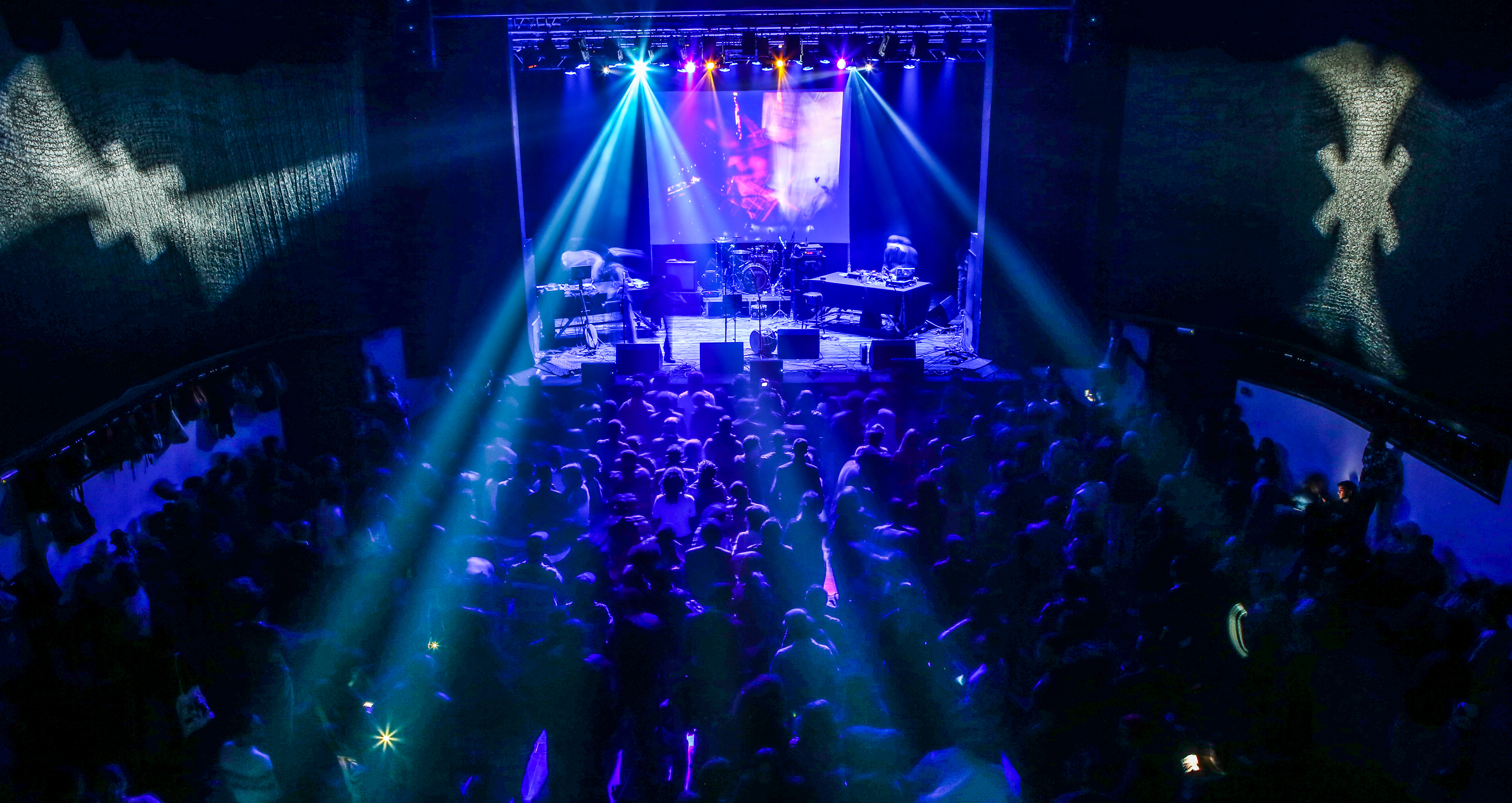
The band Ambiance performing at Cinema Renaissance in 2018.

Sometimes at rock concerts, lighters are held or waved in the air to signal an encore or a power ballad. With the decline of smokers, the restrictions placed on carrying lighters during air travel, and the increase of mobile phones in the early 21st century, cell phones (specifically the camera flash) are often used in place of lighters, and as a way to take personal pictures and videos. As early as 2001, cell phones were waved in the air during a Philippine concert by the Corrs. While this is frowned upon by some fans, cell phone use is fairly commonplace at concerts. Several artists, such as Björk, Prince, Neutral Milk Hotel, and Jack White have requested that audience members refrain from using their cell phones during their concerts.

== See also ==
- Gottfried van Swieten - an 18th-century pioneer of modern forms of classical music concert etiquette
- Concert abuse in the 2020s
