= Natalia Khoma =

Ukrainian-born cellist

- Наталія Хома
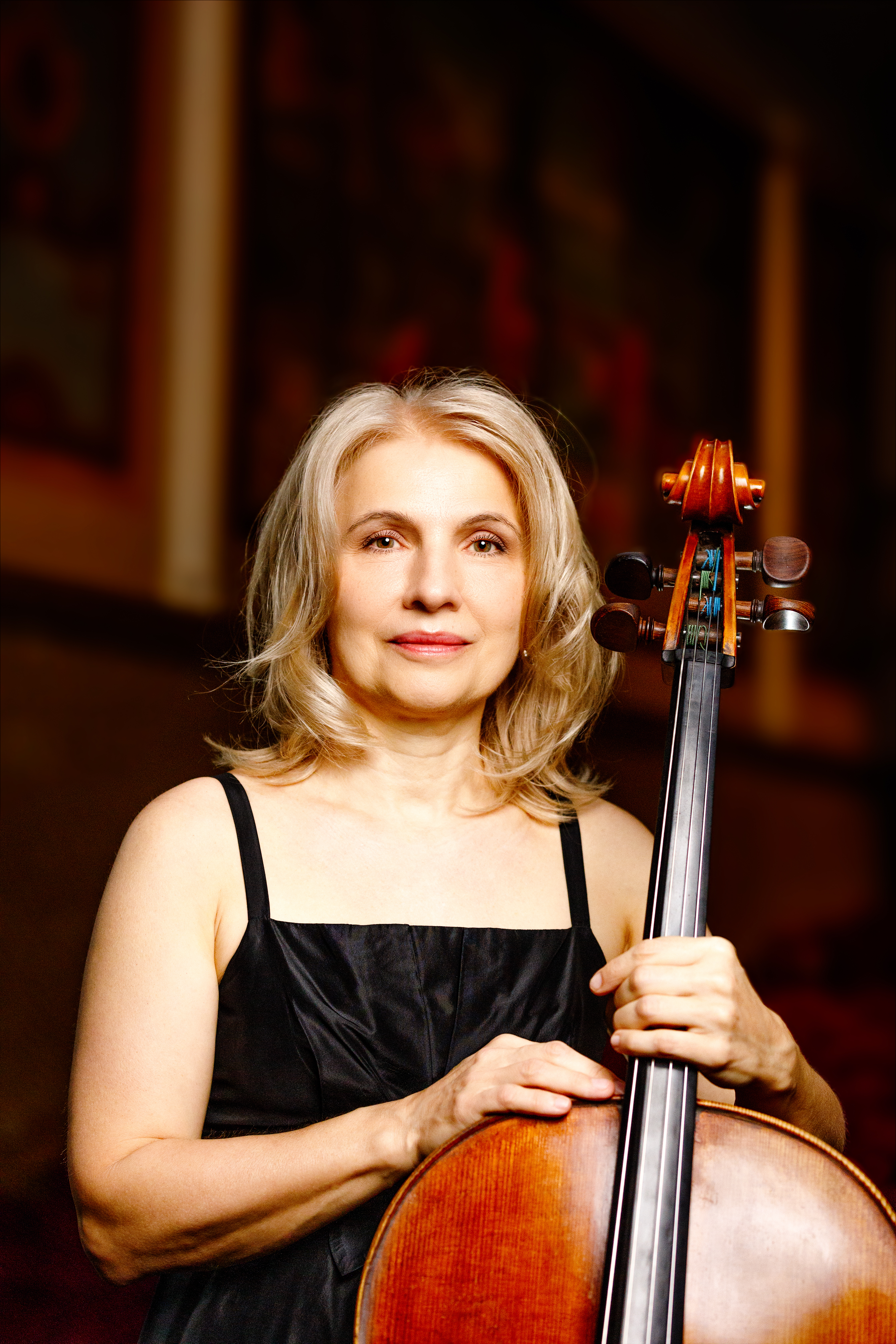
- Born: Lviv, Ukrainian SSR
- Occupation: Cellist
- Years active: 1981–present
- Website: www.nataliakhoma.com

Natalia Khoma (Ukrainian: Наталія Хома) is a Ukrainian-born cellist. She is the first and only Ukrainian cellist to become a laureate of the International Tchaikovsky Competition in Moscow, Russia.

== Early life and education ==
Natalia Khoma was born in Lviv, Ukraine. She studied at the Solomia Krushelnytska School with Evhen Shpitzer, and at the Moscow Conservatory with Natalia Shakhovskaya. She also completed an Artist Diploma from Boston University under the direction of Leslie Parnas.

== Career ==
Khoma made her first public appearance on TV at age ten and performed her first concerto with an orchestra at age thirteen. She has performed as a soloist with the Berlin Radio Orchestra, Moscow Radio Orchestra, Belgrade Philharmonic Orchestra, Budapest Philharmonic Orchestra, Ukrainian National State Symphony Orchestra, Johannesburg Philharmonic Orchestra, Chamber Ensemble of New York City Symphony Orchestra, and the Franz Liszt Chamber Orchestra. She has also performed solo and duo recitals with pianist Volodymyr Vynnytsky.

Khoma is a Professor of Cello at the College of Charleston in Charleston, SC, Director of the Charleston Music Fest and President of the Board of Music and Art Center of Greene County, NY. Khoma has been a professor at the Lviv Conservatory in Ukraine, Roosevelt University College of Music in Chicago, Michigan State University and was a visiting professor of the University of Connecticut School of Music.

For several years, Khoma played a Stradivarius cello. In 2010, Khoma was featured on Gnattali: Solo & Chamber Works For Guitar, for which Marc Regnier was nominated for a Grammy Award for Best Chamber Music Performance. Natalia’s CD of Johann Sebastian Bach Six Cello Suites was released in August 2018 by Sheva Collection, based in the UK. Ermanno De Stefani, CEO and Founder of Sheva Collection commented: “Wonderful achievement for a Sheva CD: Bach Cello Suites, magically performed by Natalia Khoma, has been downloaded/streamed 220.215 times in one month (November 2018)”. This is the quote from its website page: “ Best Seller CD Ever: Natalia Khoma’s Bach Cello Suites!”

In February 2020, Khoma performed in 18 concerts during a North American tour as a soloist with the National Symphony Orchestra of Ukraine, with management by Columbia Artists. In February of 2024, Khoma once again toured with the National Symphony Orchestra of Ukraine.

== Awards ==
- 1981 Lysenko All Ukraine Competition (First Prize)
- 1985 Budapest Pablo Casals International Competition, Hungary (Diploma)
- 1987 Markneukirchen International Cello Competition, (Second Prize) and Max Reger Special Prize, Germany
- 1990 Jeunesses Musicales International Cello Competition, Belgrade, Serbia (First Prize)
- 1990 International Tchaikovsky Competition, Moscow, Russia (Fourth Prize)

== Honors ==
- 2008 Honorary Professor of Lviv National Music Academy, Ukraine
- 2010 Honorary Professor of Odesa National Academy of Music, Ukraine
- 2015 Honorary Professor of Tchaikovsky National Music Academy of Ukraine
- 2015 The Order of Merit for outstanding achievements in the art of music (National Music Academy of Ukraine, Ukraine)

== Discography ==
- 1995 Music of Virko Baley “Orpheus singing”, TNC/Cambria Records
- 1996 Music of Ami Maayani, IMP
- 1996 Music of Adam Khudoyan, Ongaku Records
- 1997 Chamber music of Arensky and Tchaikovsky, Russian Disc
- 1998 Music of Schubert and Schumann (Lori Sims, piano), TNC/Cambria Records
- 1998 Trios by Lyatoshinsky (Oleh Krysa, violin; Tatiana Chekina, piano) TNC/ Cambria records
- 2001 Concertos of Haydn with Kyiv Camerata Chamber Orchestra (Virko Baley, conductor), TNC/Cambria Records
- 2002 "Treny", TNC/Cambria Records
- 2004 Music of Krommer, Naxos
- 2004 Sonatas of Beethoven and Rachmaninov, Blue Griffin Records
- 2006 “Dances” (Volodymyr Vynnytsky, piano), Blue Griffin Records
- 2006 “DSCH”, Music of Schostakovich, Suoni e Colori, France
- 2010 “Sing we now of Christmas”, MSR Classics, Taylor Festival Choir; Robert Taylor, Conductor
- 2010 Radames Gnattali, Solo and Chamber Works for Guitar, Marc Regnier, guitar; Dorian sono luminus
- 2010 Rachmaninov Trio and Vynnytsky “Lost Tango” (Two Plus One Trio) Centaur Records
- 2010 Sonatas of Brahms and Shostakovich (Adrian Oetiker, piano), Centaur Records
- 2012 “La Mer”, Claude Debussy, Sonata for Cello and Piano; Volodymyr Vynnytsky, piano; Suoni e Colori, France
- 2014 Saint-Saens Concerto with Symphony orchestra of Lysenko Lviv Music Academy (Alexandre Brussilovsky, conductor), Suoni e Colori, France
- 2014 “Concert”, Chausson Piano Trio, Alexandre Brussilovsky, violin; Volodymyr Vynnytsky, piano; Suoni e Colori, France
- 2014 Cello Duos (Suren Bagratuni, cello), Centaur Records
- 2015 “Tempo do Brasil”, Marc Regnier, classical guitar, V.Vynnytsky, piano; Reference Recordings
- 2016 “Celtic Mass”, music of McGlynn and MacMillan; Taylor Festival Choir; Robert Taylor, Conductor; Delos Productions, Inc.
- 2018 J. S. Bach Six Suites for Solo Cello; Sheva Collection

== Published book ==
- Khoma, Natalia (2016). Scales, Arpeggios and Double Stops for Cello. Duma Music, Incorporated. ISBN 9780692748312.

== Selected appearances - concert halls ==
- Hylton Center, George Mason University (Manassas, VA), 02/25/2024
- North Penn High School Theatre, Lansdale PA, 02/24/2024
- Troy Savings Bank Music Hall, Troy NY, 02/22/2024
- Hamel Music Center (University of Wisconsin-Madison, Madison WI), 02/20/2024
- Helzberg Hall, Kauffman Center, Kansas City MO, 02/18/2024
- Emerson Concert Hall, Schwartz Center (Emory University, Atlanta, GA), 02/16/2024
- Wellin Hall, Hans H Schambach Center (Hamilton College, Clinton NY), 02/12/2024
- Bailey Hall, Cornell University, Ithaca, NY, 02/10/2024
- Jesse Auditorium (University of Missouri, MO), 02/29/2020
- Sauder Concert Hall (Goshen College, IN), 02/28/2020
- Center for the Arts Concert Hall (George Mason University, VA), 02/22/2020
- George Washington Auditorium (Danville, VA), 02/20/2020
- Givens Performing Arts Center (Pembroke, NC), 02/18/2020
- Theatre at Mayo Arts Center (Morristown, NJ), 02/16/2020
- Mechanics Hall (Worcester, MA), 02/14/2020
- Weis Center for the Performing Arts (Bucknell University, PA), 02/09/2020
- Lviv Philharmonic Hall (Ukraine), 11/25/2007, 9/2008, 09/25/2012, 12/04/2012, 12/26/2019
- Gaillard Center (Charleston, SC), 10/27/2007, 04/17/2019
- Rosslyn Spectrum Theatre (Arlington, VA), 11/13/1999, 11/13/2000, 03/25/2018
- Tempe Center for the Arts (AZ), 04/23/2017
- Great Hall of Ukrainian National Tchaikovsky Academy of Music (Kyiv, Ukraine), 12/23/2016
- Great Hall of Lviv National Academy of Music (Ukraine), 12/25/2015
- Philharmonic Big Hall of Columns (Kyiv, Ukraine), 09/30/2006, 12/18/2015
- Baker Hall Zoellner Arts Center (Lehigh University, PA), 10/19/2014
- Sottile Theatre (Charleston, SC), 3/13, 3/14 and 3/15/2014
- Simons Center (Stony Brook University, NY), 08/16/2012
- Carnegie Hall Main Hall Stern Auditorium/Perelman Stage (New York, NY), 11/29/2011
- Zamek Bludov (Czech Republic), 06/18/2011
- Odesa Philharmonic Theatre (Ukraine), 05/29/2010
- Britton Recital Hall (UofM, Ann Arbor, MI), 04/18/2004, 04/22/2003, 11/07/2009
- Teatro de Santa Isabel in Recife (Brazil), 12/12/2007
- Salons de Boffrand de la Presidence du Senat (Paris, France), 11/13/2006
- Amphitheatre Richelieu de la Sorbonne (Paris, France), 11/10/2006
- Ordway Center for the Performing Arts (Saint Paul, MN), 10/2006
- Linder Auditorium in Johannesburg (South Africa), 08/13/2006
- Baxter Theatre Centre Concert Hall (Cape Town, South Africa), 08/19/2006
- Auditorium Gilles de la Rocque (Courchevel, France), 2/27-2/28/2006
- Rockville Center (Molloy College, NY), 11/02/2005
- Carnegie Hall Weil Recital Hall (New York, NY), 11/21/1994, 05/29/2002, 05/29/2005
- Fine Arts Center (Greenville, SC), 10/28/2005
- The Governor’s Palace (Curacao, Netherlands Antilles), 4/10/1999, 9/24/2005, 09/20/2004
- Doc Rando Recital Hall (University of Nevada, Las Vegas), 11/09/2003
- Bing Theater (Los Angeles, CA), 11/12/2003
- Von der Mehden Recital Hall (UConn, CT), 04/16/2003, 10/16/2003
- Le Petit Trianon Concert Hall (San Jose, CA), 10/27/2002
- Music Recital Hall (Southern Oregon University, Ashland, OR), 10/24/2002
- Wharton Center for Performing Arts (MSU, Lansing MI), 11/10/2001
- McKenna Theatre SUNY (New Paltz, NY), 07/28/2001
- Chicago Cultural Center (Chicago, IL), 08/27/1999
- Trinity Church Broadway at Wall Street (New York, NY), 07/29/1999
- Rudolph Ganz Memorial Hall Chicago Musical College (Roosevelt University, IL), 02/18/1999
- Krannert Center for the Performing Arts (UIUC, IL), 4/5/1996, 2/3/1997, 2/7/1997, 2/28/1999
- Regenstein Recital Hall (Northwestern University, Chicago, IL), 10/11/1998
- Swope Hall Auditorium (West Chester University, PA), 04/18/1998
- Dalton Center Recital Hall (Western Michigan University, MI), 02/04/1998
- Ward Recital Hall The Catholic University of America (Washington, DC), 10/26/1997
- Black Box Theatre (University of Nevada, Las Vegas), 09/12/1997
- Sweeney Concert Hall Sage Hall (Smith College, Northampton, MA), 04/05/1997
- Jordan Hall (Boston, MA), 07/09/1996
- Merkin Hall at Lincoln Center for the Performing Arts (New York, NY), 11/29/1992, 03/26/1996
- Tonhalle St. Gallen (Switzerland), 03/09/1996
- Ohio University Recital Hall (Athens, OH), 07/22/1996
- Henry Crown Auditorium (Jerusalem, Israel), 07/1995
- Alaska Center for the Performing Arts, Sidney Laurence Theatre (Anchorage, AK), 09/23/1995
- Grand Hall at Queen's University (Kingston, Canada), 01/22/1995
- Marston Theatre (Anchorage, AK), 01/05/1995
- Bernheim Hall (Mobile, AL), 04/10/1994
- Tsai Performance Center (Boston, MA), 01/28/1993
- Theatre "Principal" (Olot, Spain), 05/08/1992
- Teatro - Sala De Conciertos, Centro Cultural Caixa Vigo (Vigo, Spain), 05/05/1992
- Teatro Juan Bravo (Segovia, Spain), 04/30/1992
- Palais des Beux Arts (Brussels, Belgium), 10/1990
- Conservatoire de Musique de Bruxelles (Brussels, Belgium), 10/1990
- Great Hall of Norwegian Academy of Music (Oslo, Norway), 11/1990
- Tchaikovsky Hall (Moscow, Russia), 06/1990
- Esterhazy Palace (Shopron, Hungary), 05/1990
- Small Hall of Moscow State Tchaikovsky Conservatory (Russia), 05/1990
- Cremona Opera Theatre (Italy), 03/1990
- Rachmaninov Hall of Moscow State Tchaikovsky Conservatory (Russia), 09/1987
- Schauspielhaus (Berlin, Germany), 03/20/1987
- Chamber Music House (Yerevan, Armenia), 05/1986
- Great Hall of Franz Liszt Academy of Music (Budapest, Hungary), 10/1985
- Great Hall of Moscow State Tchaikovsky Conservatory (Russia), 05/1985
