= Ukraina Stadium =

Multi-purpose stadium in Lviv, Ukraine

Coordinates: 49°49′09″N 24°02′53″E

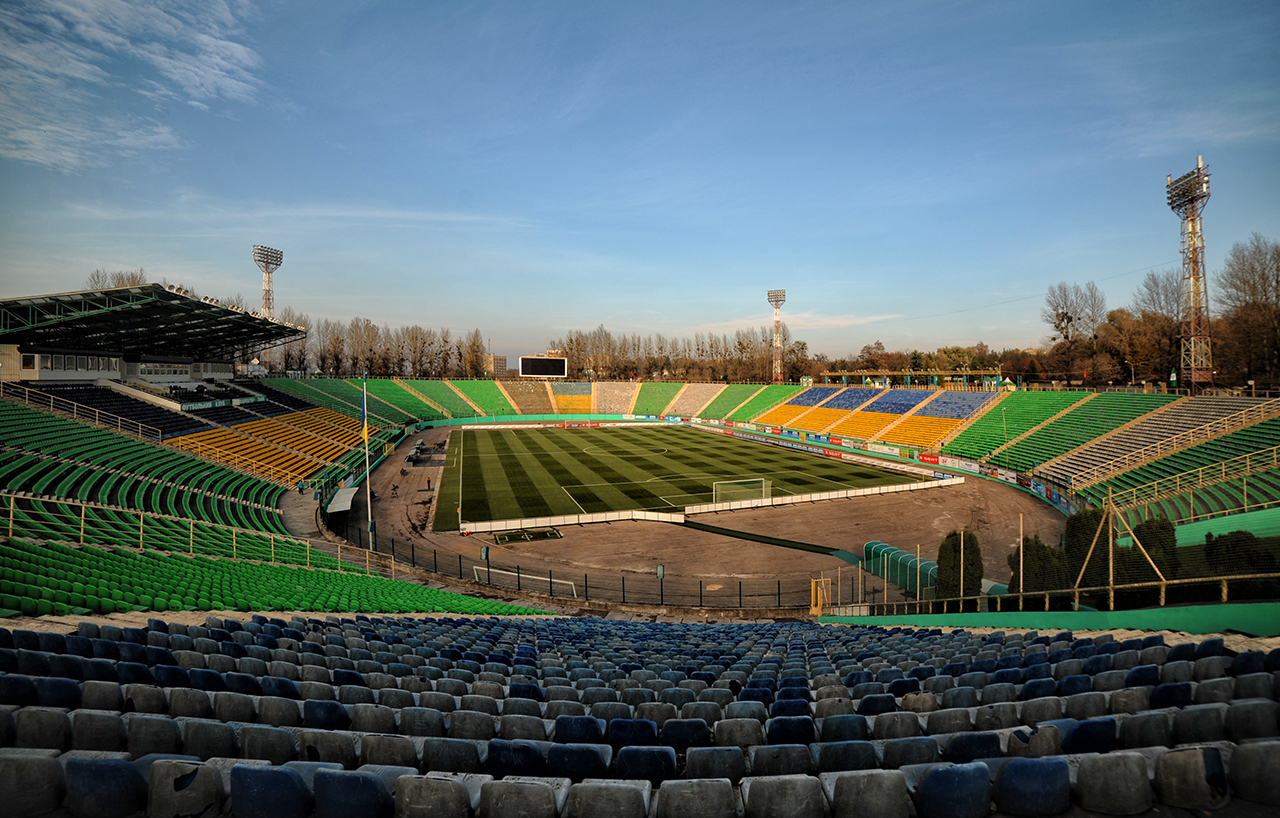
- Interactive map of Ukraina Stadium
- Former names: Druzhba (1963-1990)
- Location: Halych district, Lviv, Ukraine
- Owner: City of Lviv
- Operator: Karpaty Lviv
- Capacity: 28,051 (football)
- Surface: Grass
- Field size: 105 m × 68 m (344 ft × 223 ft)

Construction
- Groundbreaking: 1960
- Opened: 1963
- Architects: Yaroslav Nazarkevych, Larysa Skoryk, Yaroslav Porokhnavets, Volodymyr Blyusyuk

Tenants
- Karpaty Lviv / SKA Karpaty Lviv (1963–2011, since 2013); Ukraine national football team (2001–2011); Lviv FC (2008–2009); Rukh Lviv (2017–2019)

Ukraina Stadium (Ukrainian: стадіон Україна) is a multi-purpose stadium in Lviv, Ukraine. It is currently used mostly for association football matches, and is the home of FC Karpaty Lviv. "Ukraina" is also an alternative stadium for the Ukraine national football team where it played several of its qualification games for various tournaments. The stadium is located in the central part of the city in the Snopkiv Park which is classified as the monument of park architecture (landscape art).

== Brief outlook ==
During Soviet times, the stadium was called Druzhba (Ukrainian: Дружба), which means "friendship". It was named after Druzhba park that was building along with it in historical neighborhood of Snopkiv. The stadium was erected in three years by the method of public construction (collective construction), meaning that each big company of Lviv was responsible for construction of its own part of the future stadium. The construction was headed by the third secretary of the Communist Party City Committee, Vasyl Mazur, who also took part in the construction. The architects were Yaroslav Nazarkevych, Larysa Skoryk, Yaroslav Porokhnavets, Volodymyr Blyusyuk. The official debut game took place on 18 August 1963, when the local Karpaty Lviv were playing against the visiting Zalgiris Vilnius. On the 86th minute, Ivan Dykovets failed to convert a penalty kick and the game ended in the loss by the home team, 0-1.

In its initial years the Druzhba Stadium had capacity to hold 41,700 seated spectators. The most attended games were an exhibition game with Palmeiras (Brazil) on 26 May 1970 (around 50,000) and the game with Dynamo Kyiv on 27 June 1971 as part of the 1971 Soviet Top League season (51,000). On 13 October 1971, the Soviet Union Olympic football team was hosting its opponents from Austria in a qualification game for the 1972 Summer Olympics.

In 1990, by the initiative of the president of Karpaty Lviv, Karlo Miklyosh (former member of Ukraina Lwow), the name of stadium was changed to "Ukraina". In 1999, the stadium was renovated in preparation to the Karpaty's participation in the 1999–2000 UEFA Cup, after which the stadium's capacity was reduced to 28,051. In 2007, a new grass pitch was installed at the stadium. Ukraina also has four floodlight towers with lighting power of 1,200 lux.

== Ukraine national team matches ==
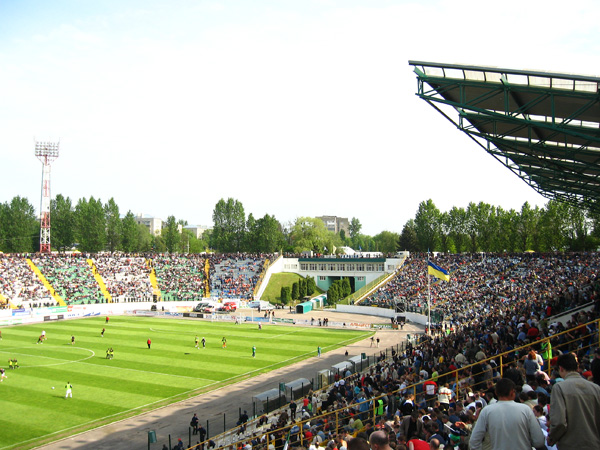

Date	Tournament	Host	Score	Guest
5 September 2001	WCQ	Ukraine	3–0	Armenia
7 June 2003	EQ	Ukraine	4–3	Armenia
13 October 2004	WCQ	Ukraine	2–0	Georgia
20 August 2008	F	Ukraine	1–0	Poland
6 September 2008	WCQ	Ukraine	1–0	Belarus
29 May 2010	F	Ukraine	3–2	Romania
