= Volodymyr Denysenko =

Film director and screenwriter (1930–1984)

- Born: 7 January 1930
- Died: 10 June 1984 (aged 54); Kyiv
- Occupation: Screenwriter

Volodymyr Denysenko (Ukrainian: Володимир Терентійович Денисенко, January 7, 1930 – June 10, 1984) was a Ukrainian film director and screenwriter. He was a laureate of the Shevchenko Prize in 1979 for the film Reapers (Ukrainian: «Женці») and People's Artist of the Ukrainian SSR.

== Life and work ==
Volodymyr Denysenko was born in Medwin village in Kyiv district. In 1947 he entered Kyiv theatre institute, but in 1948 he was arrested for "bourgeois nationalism" and imprisoned for five years. As late as in 1953 he was liberated and rehabilitated in 1956. In 1956 he finished Kyiv theatre institut and improved his skills in Moscow under Oleksandr Dovzhenko.

Since 1959 he worked as a lecturer at Kyiv theatre institut and also as a film director and screenwriter at Dovzhenko Film Studios. His most famous movies are:

- 1978 "Reapers" (ukr.«Женці»), the movie about Soviet Russian peasant won the Prize "For a vivid screen reflection of the modern village life problems", (Ashgabat, 1979) and the main prize of the festival «Human of work on the screen», (Luhansk, 1980)
- 1981 (ukr. «Високий перевал»), the movie about the liberation struggle of Ukrainians under Soviet enslavement after WWII. This movie is known mostly for its memorable music theme - Melody composed by Myroslav Skoryk.

He died on June 10, 1984, and was buried at Baikove Cemetery in Kyiv.
