= Carpathian Concerto =

The Carpathian Concerto is a composition for a large symphony orchestra by Myroslav Skoryk. The work, written in 1972, "was inspired by the culture and folklore of the west region of Ukraine."

== Sources ==
1. Кияновська Любов. Мирослав Скорик: творчий портрет композитора в дзеркалі епохи. Львів: Сполом, 1998, ISBN 966-7445-10-0.
2. Кияновська Любов. Мирослав Скорик: людина і митець. Львів, 2008, ISBN 966-7790-11-8.
3. Щириця Юрій. Мирослав Скорик. Київ: Музична Україна, 1979.
