= Lori Sims =

American pianist

Lori Sims is an American pianist. In 2026, Sims was appointed professor of piano at the Indiana University Jacobs School of Music; she is also professor of piano at Western Michigan University, where she began working in 1997. In 2003, she was named the John T. Bernhard Professor of Music, one of thirteen named chairs at the university. She was also named Distinguished Professor in the College of Fine Arts in 2020. Sims is a Steinway Artist.

After winning the Gold Medal at the 1998 Gina Bachauer International Piano Competition, Lori Sims performed throughout North and South America, Europe, and China including engagements with the NordDeutscheRadio Orchester in Hannover, Israel Philharmonic, Indianapolis Symphony, Utah Symphony, Rockford Symphony, and Kalamazoo Symphony Orchestra. Sims was named Classical Fellow of the American Piano Awards in 1993. Other awards include first prize co-winner of the 1994 Felix Bartholdy-Mendelssohn Competition in Berlin, and the silver medal in the 1987 Kosciuszko Foundation Chopin Competition. She made her Alice Tully Hall debut in 2000, and has been a featured recitalist at the Irving S.Gilmore International Piano Festival seven times.

== Education ==
Sims received an Artist Diploma from the Hochschule für Musik, Theater, und Medien in Hannover, Germany under the tutelage of Arie Vardi. She studied under Leon Fleisher at the Peabody Conservatory for her bachelor's degree, and she received her master's degree from the Yale School of Music as a student of Daniel Pollack and Claude Frank.

== Discography ==
- 1998 Music of Schubert and Schumann (with Natalia Khoma, cello) – TNC/Cambria Records
- 2007 William Bolcom: Works for Violin & Piano (with Renata Artman Knific, violin) – MSR Classics
- 2012 Beethoven, R. Schumann, C. Schumann, Rachmaninoff – TwoPianists Records
- 2013 American Classics – TwoPianists Records
- 2015 Bach: Goldberg Variations – TwoPianists Records
- 2020 Impressions of Debussy (with Andrew Rathbun, soprano saxophone and Jeremy Siskind, piano) – Centaur Records
