= Larysa Skoryk =

Ukrainian architect and politician

- Лариса Скорик
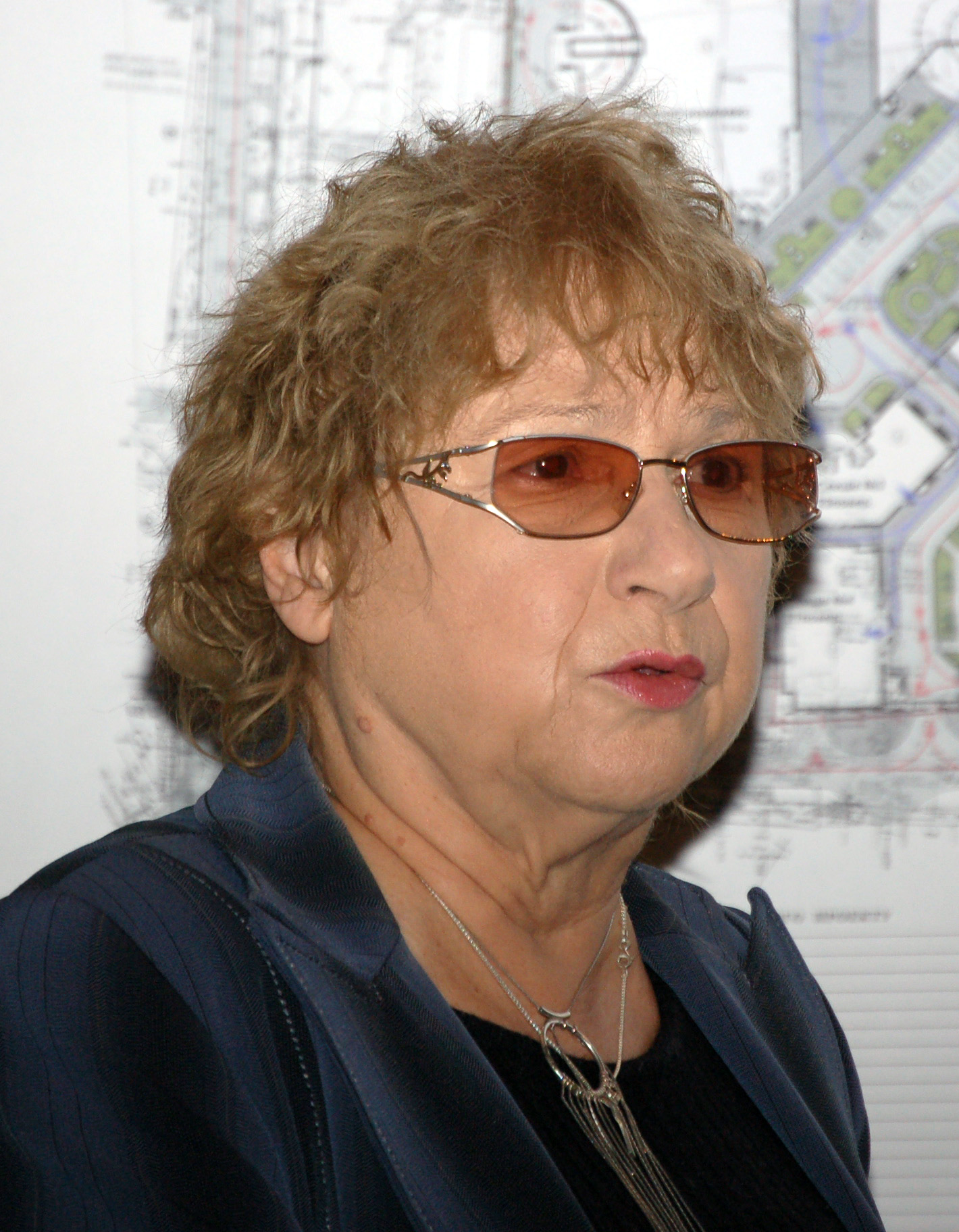
- Skoryk in January 2011

Member of the Verkhovna Rada
- In office 15 May 1990 – 10 May 1994

Personal details
- Born: Larysa Pavlivna Kuzma; 4 October 1939 (age 86) Lubaczów, Poland
- Party: People's Movement of Ukraine
- Spouse: Myroslav Skoryk (died 2020)
- Education: Lviv Polytechnic
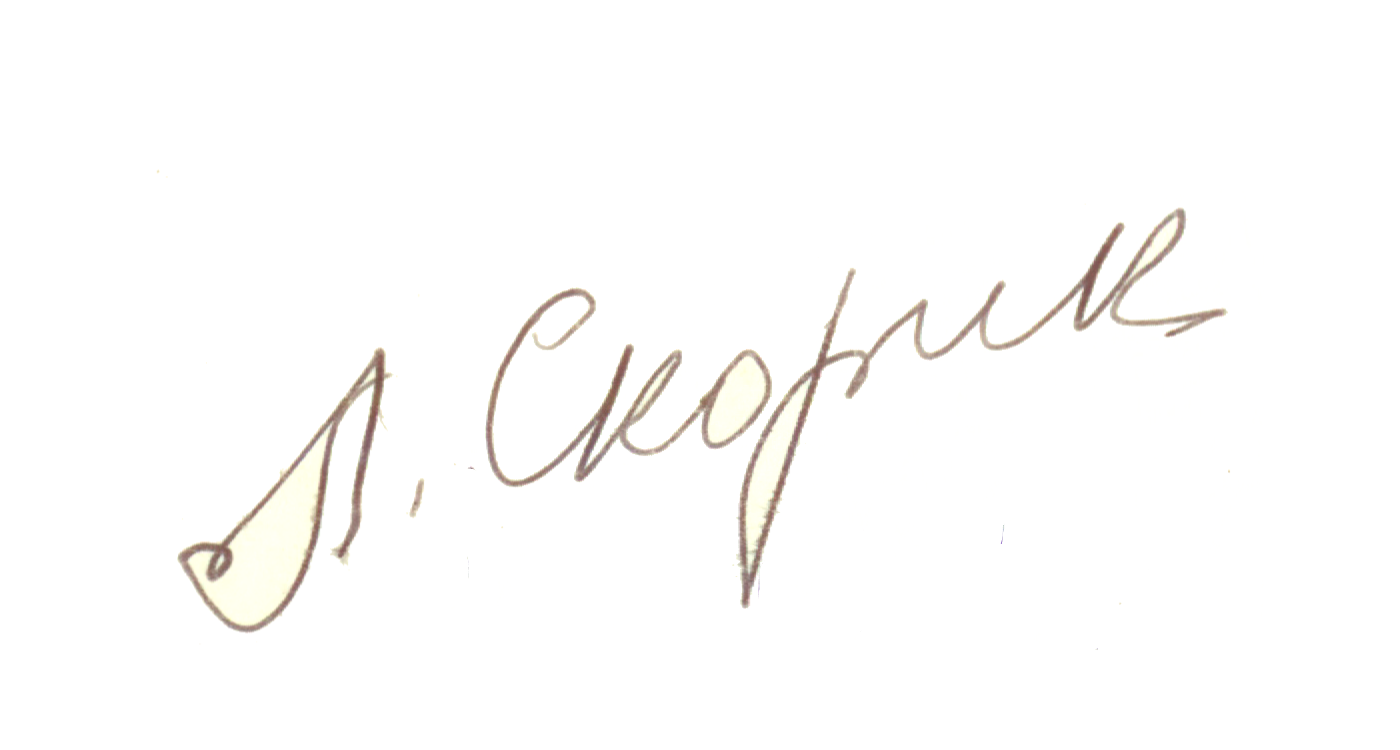
- Signature

Larysa Pavlivna Skoryk (Ukrainian: Лариса Павлівна Скорик, née Kuzma; born 4 October 1939), is a Ukrainian architect and former politician, who is the professor of the National Academy of Fine Arts and Architecture.

She served as a member of parliament, People's Deputy of Ukraine of the 1st convocation of the Verkhovna Rada from 1990 to 1994. She was the wife of composer and Hero of Ukraine Myroslav Skoryk.

== Biography ==
Skoryk was born Larysa Kuzma on 4 October 1939 in Lubaczow (now Poland) into a family of teachers.

She graduated from school No. 5, then, in 1954, she was a student of Lviv Polytechnic Institute.

After she graduated from the Lviv Polytechnic Institute in 1960, she became an architect of the Donetsk branch of the "Dipromisto" Institute. In 1961, she was an architect of the Lviv branch of "Lvivteploelektroproekt". By 1963, she was a senior architect of the design institute "Dipromisto" in Lviv. In 1967, she was a graduate student of the Kyiv Engineering and Construction Institute.

By 1971, she had been a senior teacher, the head of the creative workshop of the department of architectural design, and associate professor of the Kyiv State Art Institute.

By 1990, she had been the professor of the Department of Architecture of the Ukrainian Academy of Arts. She was a member of the NRU, namely: a member of the faction of the Congress of National Democratic Forces, a delegate to the Constituent Assembly of the NRU; vice-president of the Union of Architects of Ukraine, member of the Central Board; head of the People's Movement of Ukraine.

She is also a member of the NRU, delegate of the Constituent Assembly of the NRU, member of the Central Board; head of the All-People's Movement of Ukraine.

The labor team of the Kyiv State Art Institute nominated her as a candidate for People's Deputies of Ukraine. On 18 March 1990, Skoryk won 45.04% of the votes she received in the 2nd round, and was therefore elected as a member of parliament, People's Deputy of Ukraine out of 26 applicants. After that, she joined the faction of the Congress of National Democratic Forces.

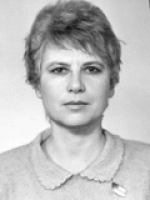
Official portrait, 1990

During her parliamentary mandate, she held the position of Chairman of the Subcommittee of the Commission of the Verkhovna Rada of Ukraine on Culture and Spiritual Revival.

In addition to her mandate as of 1990, her candidacy was nominated by the voters to the People's Deputies of Ukraine of the Verkhovna Rada of the XIII convocation, according to the results of which she took 2nd place out of 20 applicants, as she received 40.78% of the votes in the 2nd round.

During the 2004 presidential elections, she spoke in support of Viktor Yanukovych.

=== Reconstruction of the Taras Shevchenko Museum in Kaniv ===
The reconstruction of the Taras Shevchenko Museum in Kaniv lasted 7 years from 2003 to 2010.The renovated museum reopened on August 23, 2010.Contemporary coverage of the reconstruction associated Larysa Skoryk with the project.

The most interesting reconstruction option was proposed by the team of the Shevchenko National Reserve in Kaniv. Their option provided for the reconstruction of the Krychevsky building in its original form, both from the facade and in the interiors. In addition, Shevchenko had to be presented in the form of an old treasure chest in a striped cap, the most famous symbol of the strict Father of the peasant "national minority" according to Soviet canons. However, a group of advisers to the Minister of Culture, Vasyl Vovkun, made a conclusion regarding the meeting on the concept of the Shevchenko National Reserve in Kaniv on 17 June 2008, and as a result of this conclusion, it completely contradicted the ideological canons and the general concept proposed by the team of the Shevchenko National Reserve.

Due to the fact that both options contradicted each other conceptually, it was proposed to develop a project that would combine the main principles proposed by the team of the Shevchenko National Reserve in Kaniv and the group of advisers to the Minister of Culture, Vovkun. As a result, such a project was created, which, on the one hand, meets the modern consensus about the museum as a public institution, whose main purpose is to store exhibits of the past, and on the other hand, such an institution should be high-tech, entertaining, educational and meet all the requirements of future visitors, regardless of their age, nationality and religious beliefs. In other words, the museum should become the Ukrainian analogue of the Mona Lisa in the Louvre, that is, become an interactive center that would combine interesting stories with multimedia technologies.

And at the same time - and this was the goal in vain - the museum was to become the starting point of a modern national idea.

To implement this project, a special creative group was created, which was to be headed by Mykola Yakovyna, who at that time held the position of Deputy Minister of Culture of Ukraine. In addition to him, the group included the following famous architects and artists, namely: Oleksandr Babak, Petro Bevza, Oleksandr Dyachenko, Mykola Zhuravel, Viktor Vecherskyi, Viktor Khomenko, Kyrylo Kobtsev.

About the fact that the project did not come to fruition, the head of the group, Mykola Yakovyna, since lost his position as Deputy Minister of Culture, the project documentation and all the presentations that were prepared by this group were lost among the offices of the ministry, no contracts were signed with the author's team, therefore no money was transferred for the implementation of that project

The situation remained hopeless until the awarding of the winners of the State Shevchenko Prize took place in March 2010, which coincidentally happened in this very museum. The organizers and visitors of this ceremony complained about the terrible restoration and museum affairs, which prompted the then President of Ukraine, Yanukovych, to issue an order regarding the allocation of funds for the restoration. It should not be forgotten that in 2014 the celebration of the 200th anniversary of Shevchenko's birthday was planned, and the authorities of that time needed to maintain their political and social status at a sufficient level.

And then the situation resembled a night terror. The new author of the old project became Skoryk, who until that moment had nothing to do with the restoration. She even invited the author's team to her as a consultation. However, this was their first and last visit to Skoryk. All subsequent actions and decisions were made by Skoryk alone.

The pace of reconstruction was frantic, as this event drew close attention from the main figures of the country's political world. But the chosen tactic had its negative consequences. First, when you are in a hurry with the result, and even more so when you were not the primary developer of a complex creative project, it is difficult to understand the whole picture as a whole and not to lose small, although very valuable details.

The renovated museum was solemnly opened by the President Yanukovych on 23 August 2010. The restored museum received mixed reviews from various experts: from full approval to harsh criticism. For example, when the primary author's team came to the opening of the museum, they sighed heavily, because what ended up in the final case did not match the visual presentation they made at the time. Culturologist, journalist and artist Ida Vors accused Skoryk of appropriating someone else's reconstruction project and unsuccessfully implementing it.

=== Reserve "Babyn Yar" ===
In 2012, Skoryk presented the Development Concept of the National Historical and Memorial Reserve "Babyn Yar" developed by her own architectural workshop. According to this concept, the Museum of Memory of the Victims of "Babyn Yar" has the shape of a hexagonal "Star of David" in plan. The pre-project documentation of the construction of the museum according to Skoryk's project was approved by the Scientific and Methodological Council for the Protection of Cultural Heritage of the Ministry of Culture of Ukraine. Skoryk's development concept of the "Babyn Yar" nature reserve also received the approval of the Main Department of Urban Planning, Architecture and Design of the Urban Environment.

On 27 January 2014, she got into a political scandal with the participation of Galicians. Thus, during a round table organized by the first President of independent Ukraine, Leonid Kravchuk, she had the imprudence to express her opinion: "I can't even say semi-educated, it's practically an uneducated horde plundering Ukraine. What freedom did they lack? Maybe freedom of speech? This is an invasion that will go down in history as an invasion of absolute barbarians." These words caused a public outcry, the result of which was the writing of an open letter by representatives of the Lviv intelligentsia to the architect and People's Deputy of the first convocation (NRU) Skoryk, in which they demanded a public apology from her, because, in their opinion, she allowed herself to "cynically humiliate and insult her own people, dividing them into "right" and "wrong", achieving extraordinary "discoveries", in particular, in anti-Galician judgments". In addition, they reminded her that thanks to their support, Skoryk received a deputy mandate in 1990. To understand the scale of the situation, it is enough to list the prominent people of that time who signed this appeal, namely: writer Roman Ivanychuk, People's Artist of Ukraine Bohdan Kozak, Director of MIOK of Lviv Polytechnic University Iryna Klyuchkovska, People's Artist of Ukraine Myroslav Otkovich, singer Sofiia Fedyna, General Director of the Lviv National Art Gallery named after B. G. Voznytskyi Larisa Voznytska-Razinkova, honored cultural worker of Ukraine Roman Yatsiv, member of the National Union of Writers of Ukraine Nina Bichuya, laureate of the Shevchenko Prize of Ukraine Roman Lubkivskyi, laureate of the Shevchenko Prize of Ukraine Vasyl Otkovych.

In March 2021, she participated in a teleconference with Moscow on the occasion of Taras Shevchenko's birthday at the Kyiv representative office of the Russian Federation of Cooperation, where she thanked the Russian authorities and said that between Russia and Ukraine there are "great relations that no one will spoil".

== Personal life ==
Her first husband was half-Swedish. The couple met and married in Tallinn during the student holidays. They divorced a year and a half later. Her second husband was the composer Myroslav Skoryk. At the time of their acquaintance he was studying at a graduate school with Dmitry Kabalevsky in Moscow. She met, becoming the first performer of his song "Don't trample the lily of the valley" on the Union television program "Blue Light". They have a child.
