= Melody (Skoryk) =

Musical composition by Myroslav Skoryk

- by Myroslav Skoryk
- Native name: Мелодія
- Key: A minor
- Occasion: Vysokyy pereval (1982)
- Scoring: Flute and piano (original)

Melody (Ukrainian: Мелодія, romanized: Melodiya), also known as Melody in A minor, is a musical composition by the Ukrainian composer Myroslav Skoryk. Composed for the 1982 Soviet war film Vysokyy pereval, it has a simple structure comprising an opening theme, short development section, and modified reprise of the original theme. It was originally scored for flute and piano but has since been arranged for many other instrumentations. Melody is Skoryk's most popular work and is frequently performed in concerts, including in response to the Russian invasion of Ukraine.

== Background ==
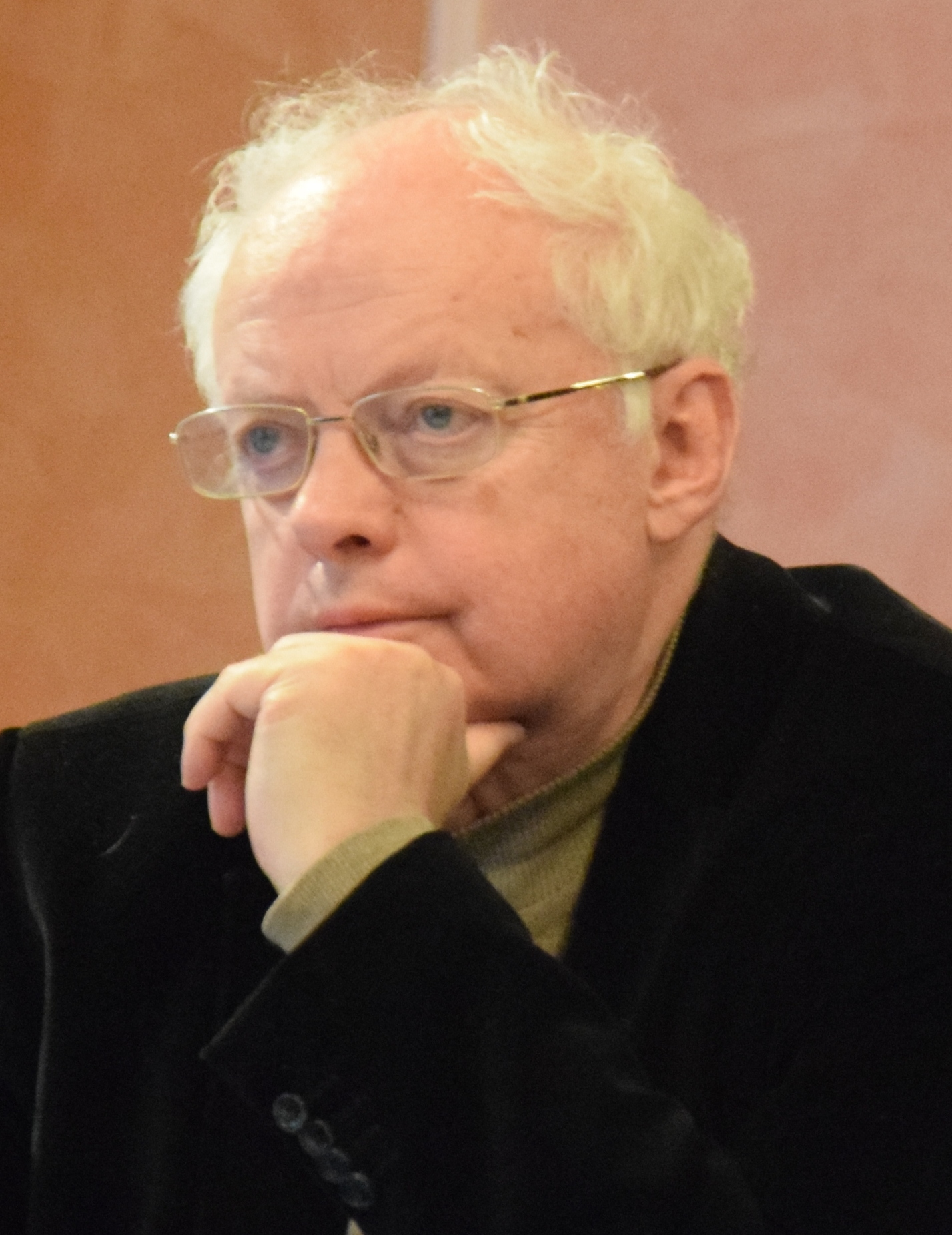
Skoryk in 2015

Skoryk composed Melody for the 1982 Soviet war film Vysokyy pereval. Set in Galicia in the aftermath of World War II, the film was subjected to Soviet censorship and negatively depicted Ukrainian nationalism. Skoryk, who composed the work at the request of the film's director, Volodymyr Denysenko, later said that although other composers had turned down the offer to compose the film's score, he wanted to create music to subversively convey the film's tragic and emotional themes. It was originally scored for flute and piano; Skoryk later arranged the work for other instruments, including violin with piano or orchestral accompaniment.

== Form ==
Melody is in small ternary form, with an opening theme, short development, and modified reprise of the original theme. It begins mostly in common time with occasional single measures in 3/4, which Skoryk described as creating a "unified statement". In the first eight measures, the key is modulated from A minor to C major and then to E major, a recurring pattern in Ukrainian folk music. According to Skoryk, he chose this sequence after studying many Ukrainian folk songs. The opening theme is then repeated, this time with a more complex counter-melody in the accompaniment.

The eight-measure development is a series of rapid changes in minor keys: from C♯ minor to G♯ minor, B minor, and F♯ minor. The accompaniment in this section similarly increases in intensity, culminating in the reprise of the original theme. The reprise includes additional voices and emphasis on the first four notes of the melody.

== Usage ==
As Skoryk's most well known composition, Melody is frequently performed in concerts and on Ukrainian radio and television. It is frequently described as a spiritual hymn of Ukraine, and has been used in commemorations of the Holodomor and the Revolution of Dignity.

In response to the Russian invasion of Ukraine, Melody has been widely performed internationally in benefit concerts and other settings. During a virtual address by Ukrainian President Volodymyr Zelenskyy to the United States Congress in March 2022, it accompanied a video of the destruction in Ukraine. The work is part of the concert program of the Kyiv Symphony Orchestra during their tour in Europe, selected for its recognisability and sentimentality.

Melody have often been used without permission for commercial purposes - in particular, in the Russian film "The Milkmaid from Khatsapetovka" (2007)
