= Volodymyr Vynnytsky =

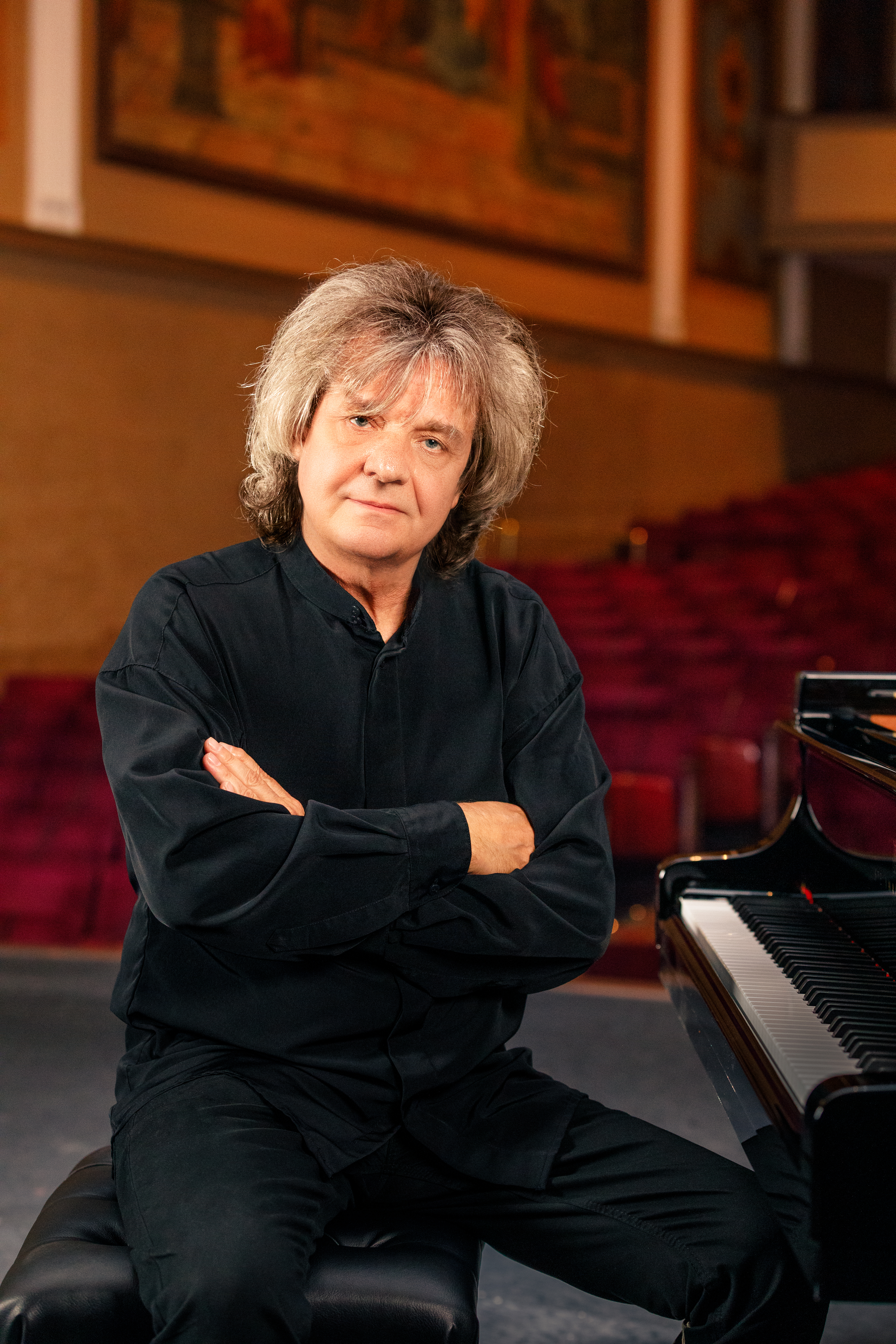
Vynnytsky, pianist. Photo by Heather Moran

Volodymyr Vynnytsky (Ukrainian: Володимир Винницький, born February 8, 1955, Lviv, Ukraine) is a Ukrainian pianist. He was the laureate of the Marguerite Long-Jacques Thibaud International Piano Competition in Paris (1983). With a career spanning many decades, Vynnytsky has established himself as a distinctive musical personality and has received critical audience acclaim for interpretation of scores.

== Education ==
Volodymyr Vynnytsky studied at the Lviv Music School for Gifted Children with Lidia Golembo and later at the Moscow Conservatory. After earning his doctorate from the Moscow Conservatory under the direction of Yevgeny Malinin, he taught at the Kyiv Conservatory and concertized extensively throughout the world.

== Career ==
Described by critics as possessing “incredible technique and deep musical understanding”, Volodymyr Vynnytsky has performed in recital in such countries as USA, France, England, Denmark, Sweden, Czech Republic, Poland, Ukraine, Russia, Brazil, Canada, South Africa among many others. A popular television and radio guest, Vynnytsky has also been featured on NHK-TV (Japan) and in the United States on WQXR-FM in New York, and nationally on NPR. Recital and chamber music appearances have included guest invitations in numerous International Festivals in Ukraine (Kyiv Music Fest, “Virtuosi”, “Contrasts”, “Bridge of Alexandre III”), France (Masters de Pontlevoy, “Les MusiCimes”, “DSCH”), Brazil (“Virtuosi”), Curaçao (Art in Avila), Canada (Niagara International Chamber Music Festival), Czech Republic (“American Spring” Festival) and USA (Artosphere Arts Festival, Chamber Players International, LWMF, Mohonk Festival of the Arts, Windham Chamber Music Festival, Southampton Festival of the Arts, Lake San Marcos Chamber Music Society, Music Mountain in Connecticut, Piccolo Spoleto in Charleston, Rachmaninoff International Festival in Los Angeles, “Music at the Institute” in New York and Art Center of Greene County. Volodymyr Vynnytsky served as a Chairman of the Jury of the Emil Gilels International Piano Competition in Odesa, Ukraine. Vynnytsky has been a visiting member of the piano faculty in SUNY at Purchase, NY and at the University of Connecticut, CT. He is the Director of Chamber Music at the College of Charleston, Charleston, SC and artistic director of the Music and Art Center of Greene County, NY. Volodymyr Vynnytsky conducted an extensive North American tour in February 2020 as a soloist with the National Symphony Orchestra of Ukraine, one of the finest Symphony Orchestras in Europe. This tour was managed by Columbia Artists, a legendary organization in the performing arts industry, a global leader in artist management. In February 2024, Vynnytsky once again toured with the National Symphony Orchestra of Ukraine.

== Honors and awards ==
- 2008 Honorary Professor of Lviv National Music Academy, Ukraine
- 2010 Honorary Professor of Odesa National Academy of Music, Ukraine
- 2015 Honorary Professor of Tchaikovsky National Music Academy of Ukraine, (Kyiv Conservatory)
- 2015 “The Order of Merit for outstanding achievements in the art of music” (National Music Academy of Ukraine, Ukraine)

== Selected appearances ==
- Théatre des Champs-Elysées (Paris, France)
- Amphitheatre Richelieu de la Sorbonne, Salons de Boffrand de la Presidence du Senat (Paris, France)
- St. John's Smith Square (London, United Kingdom)
- Dunken Kulturhus (Helsingborg, Sweden)
- The Queen's Hall (the Dronningesalen Auditorium, Copenhagen, Denmark)
- Salle de Concert Marie-Stephane (École de musique Vincent d'Indy, Montreal, Canada)
- Philharmonic Big Hall of Columns (Kyiv, Ukraine)
- Great Hall of Ukrainian National Tchaikovsky Academy of Music (Kyiv, Ukraine)
- Lviv Philharmonic Hall (Ukraine)
- Great Hall of Lviv National Academy of Music (Ukraine)
- Odesa Philharmonic Theatre (Ukraine)
- Great Hall of Moscow State Tchaikovsky Conservatory (Russia)
- Small Hall of Moscow State Tchaikovsky Conservatory (Russia)
- Rachmaninov Hall of Moscow State Tchaikovsky Conservatory (Russia)
- The Governor's Palace (Curaçao, Netherlands Antilles)
- Teatro de Santa Isabel in Recife (Brazil)
- Linder Auditorium in Johannesburg (South Africa)
- Baxter Theatre Centre Concert Hall (Cape Town, South Africa)
- Carnegie Hall Main Hall Stern Auditorium/Perelman Stage (New York, NY)
- Carnegie Hall Weil Recital Hall (New York, NY)
- Merkin Hall at Lincoln Center for the Performing Arts (New York, NY)
- The Phillips Gallery (Washington D.C.)
- Tsai Performance Center (Boston, MA)
- Gaillard Center (Charleston, SC)
- Sottile Theatre (Charleston, SC)
- Von der Mehden Recital Hall (UConn, CT)
- Rosslyn Spectrum Theatre (Arlington, VA)
- Krannert Center for the Performing Arts (University of Illinois, Champaign-Urbana, IL)
- Sacrest Auditorium (Zanesville OH),
- Hylton Performing Arts Center (George Mason University, VA)
- Anne and Ellen Fife Theatre (VA)
- Moss Arts Center (Virginia Tech)
- Schar Center (Elon University, NC)
- State Theatre New Jersey (New Brunswick)
- Troy Savings Bank Music Hall (NY)
- Center for the Performing Arts at Penn State Eisenhower Auditorium (Pennsylvania State University)
- Carpenter Theatre Dominion Energy Center, (Richmond VA)
- Millard Auditorium(University of Hartford, CT)
- Herbert Zipper Concert Hall (Los Angeles, CA)
- Scottsdale Center for the Performing Arts (Scottsdale AZ)
- Hill Auditorium (UofM, Ann Arbor, MI)

== Selected works ==
=== Selected compositions ===
- 2002 “A Healing Leaf “(“Podorozhnyk”) for Soprano and Violin, Cello and Piano, “Samba” for Piano Trio; “Lost Tango”, for Piano Trio arranged for Cello and Piano and for Violin and Piano, commissioned by Greene County Council on the Art to commemorate the 150th anniversary of the founding of the town Jewett, New York
- 2006 Bartok-Vynnytsky, Ukrainian Folk Song for Cello and Piano Premiered 12/10/2006 at the Concert Series La force de l’Esprit, New Jersey
- 2016 “Lost Tango”, published in three versions by Duma Music, Inc.
- 2020 “Short Stories for Piano”, and “Loss” for cello and piano published by Duma Music, Inc. http://www.dumamusic.com/composers/volodymyrvynnytsky.html

=== Selected CD recordings ===
- 2001 Beethoven, Sonata in A major, Rachmaninov, Sonata in G Minor; Natalia Khoma, cello; Volodymyr Vynnytsky, piano, Blue Griffin, BGR115
- 2001 TV Film, The Classic Club at Steinway Hall; Produced by D’Alessio Media, Inc., and NHK, New York, G.K. Squires Music Production
- 2005 Dances; Natalia Khoma, cello; Volodymyr Vynnytsky, piano Blue Griffin, BGR149
- 2007 “DSCH”: “Les signes secrets (The Secret Letters), Shostakovich, Trio opus 67 for violin, cello and piano; Seven Poems by A. Blok opus 127; Tatiana Smirnova, soprano, Alexandre Brussilovsky, violin; Natalia Khoma, cello; Volodymyr Vynnytsky, piano; Suoni e Colori, Paris, France
- 2007 Two Plus One Trio; Rachmaninoff, Trio Elegiaque, Vynnytsky, Lost Tango; Anna Rabinova, violin; Natalia Khoma, cello; Volodymyr Vynnytsky, piano; Centaur Records
- 2012 “La Mer”, music of Jean-Philippe Rameau and Claude Debussy; Claude Debussy, Sonata for cello and piano, Natalia Khoma, cello; Volodymyr Vynnytsky, piano; Suoni e Colori, Paris, France
- 2014 “Concert”, Chausson Piano Trio, Alexandre Brussilovsky, violin; Natalia Khoma, cello; Volodymyr Vynnytsky, piano; Suoni e Colori, France
- 2014 Saint-Saens Concerto with Symphony orchestra of Lysenko Lviv Music Academy (Alexandre Brussilovsky, conductor), Suoni e Colori, France
- 2015 “Tempo do Brasil”, Marc Regnier, classical quitar, Natalia Khoma, cello; Volodymyr Vynnytsky, piano; Reference Recordings
