= Taylor Festival Choir =

American choral group

- Origin: Charleston, South Carolina
- Genres: Choral
- Years active: 2001–present
- Labels: Delos Recordings, MSR Classics, MSR Classics
- Members: Dr. Robert Taylor
- Website: www.tmgcharleston.com

The Taylor Festival Choir is a professional choir based in Charleston, South Carolina and one part of the Taylor Music Group. It was formed in 2001 by Dr. Robert Taylor, who serves as conductor and artistic director. They have released 3 albums, recording with Delos Recordings, MSR Classics, and Centaur Records.

Their 2020 release So Hallow'd the Time featured world première recordings by American composers Brian Galante and Stephen Paulus, and received a 5-star review from Fanfare Magazine.

Their 2016 album release McGlynn and MacMillan Masses (DELOS DE3493) featured the world première recording of Celtic Mass by Michael McGlynn and was critically acclaimed as "choral singing at the very finest level... a very impressive performance indeed".

Taylor Festival Choir are regularly featured in Charleston's annual Piccolo Spoleto Festival as well as regularly staging their own concerts. They are a regular contributor to the Charleston arts and cultural scene and regularly publish content on the Taylor Music Group YouTube channel.
