= Nina Bichuya =

Ukrainian writer

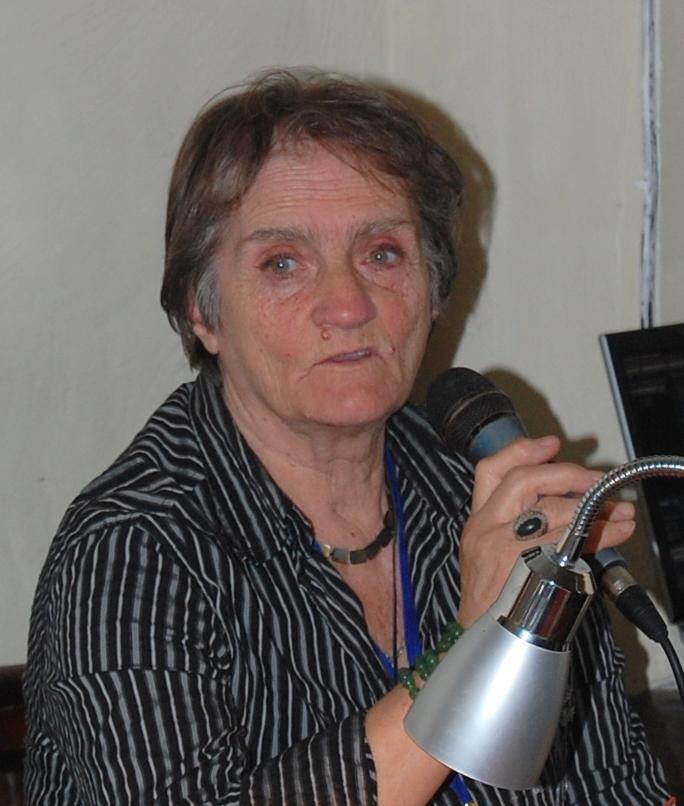
Nina Bichuya in September 2013

Nina Bichuya (born 24 August 1937) is a Ukrainian writer who has published several novels and children's works.

Bichuya studied journalism at Lviv University and has worked as a director at the Lviv Theatre for Young People (Перший український театр для дітей та юнацтва). The Ukrainian writer Valeriy Shevchuk commented that in the 1960s she was the queen of Ukrainian women's fiction while today she is considered a pioneer of the urban literature of the 1980s. One of her recent successes is Velyki korolivski lovy (The Great Royal Hunt, 2011) in which she creates psychological depth and tension in her characteristically refined style. From 1989 to 1997 she was the editor of the Prosvita newspaper.

== Creative work ==
Nina Bichuya is the author of the books Drohobytskyi Zvizdar (1970), Povisti (Novellas), April in a Boat (1981), Rodovid, Benefit Performance, and Ten Words of a Poet (1986), as well as children's books such as Holidays in Svitlogorsk (1967), Slavko Bercuta’s Rapier (1968), An Ordinary School Week (1973), and The Apple Tree and the Seed (1983). Her short stories and novellas, republished in the 2000s, were included in the collections The Lands of Romen, The Great Royal Hunt (Literary Agency "Piramida", 2011), and Three Theatrical Novellas (published by "Sribne Slovo", 2015).

She also translates Polish fiction into Ukrainian, including works by Olga Tokarczuk, Jacek Bocheński, Ludwik Jerzy Kern, and Jerzy Grotowski.

== Selected works ==
=== Novels ===
- Дрогобицький звіздар (Drogobytsky Astrologer)
- Повісті (The Story)
- Квітень у човні (April in the Boat)
- Родовід (Genealogy)
- Бенефіс (Benefit)
- Десять слів поета (The Poet's Ten Words)

=== Children's works ===
- Канікули у Світлогорську (Holidays in Svetlogorsk)
- Звичайний шкільний тиждень (Normal School Week)
- Яблуні і зернятко (Apple Trees and Seeds)
