= Myroslav Skoryk =

Ukrainian composer and teacher (1938–2020)

Hero of Ukraine Myroslav Skoryk OS, PAU
- Мирослав Скорик
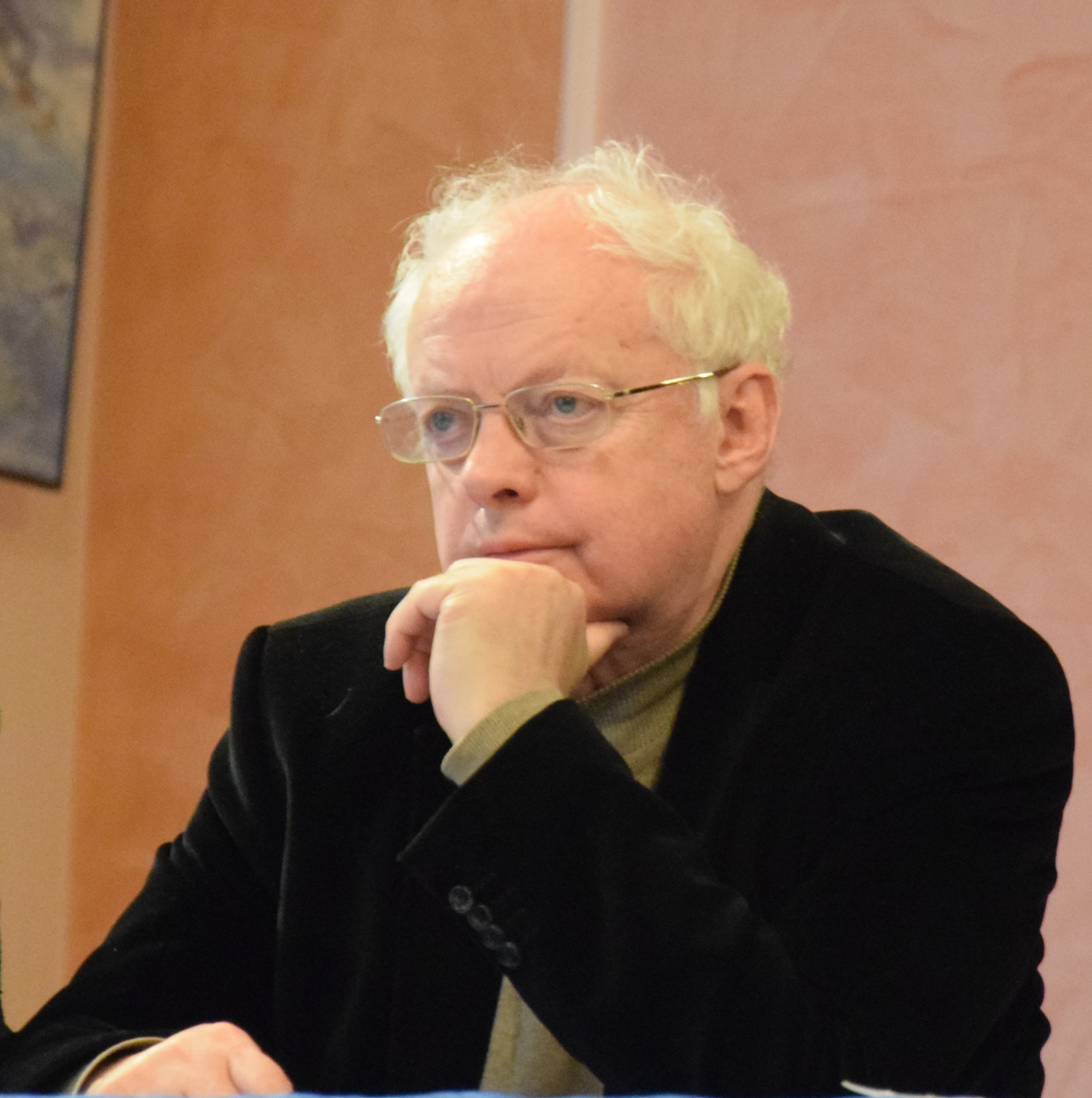
- Skoryk in 2015
- Born: 13 July 1938; Lwów, Second Polish Republic (now Lviv, Ukraine)
- Died: 1 June 2020 (aged 81); Kyiv, Ukraine
- Citizenship: Ukrainian, Australian
- Occupation: composer
- Spouse: Larysa Skoryk
- Awards: Hero of Ukraine; Shevchenko National Prize

Myroslav Mykhailovych Skoryk (Ukrainian: Мирослав Михайлович Скорик; 13 July 1938 – 1 June 2020) was a Ukrainian composer and teacher. His music is contemporary in style and contains stylistic traits from Ukrainian folk music traditions.

Skoryk was awarded the titles People's Artist of Ukraine and Hero of Ukraine.

== Early life ==
Myroslav Mykhailovych Skoryk was born in Lviv, on 13 July 1938. His parents were both educated at the University of Vienna, and subsequently became teachers. His father was a historian and an ethnographer, while his mother was a chemist. Although his parents did not have special musical training, his mother played piano and his father played the violin. Skoryk was exposed to music in the household from an early age, and his great aunt was the Ukrainian soprano Solomiya Krushelnytska.

Skoryk entered the Lviv Music School in 1945, but two years later his family were deported to Siberia, where he grew up. The family did not return to Lviv until 1955.

== Student years ==
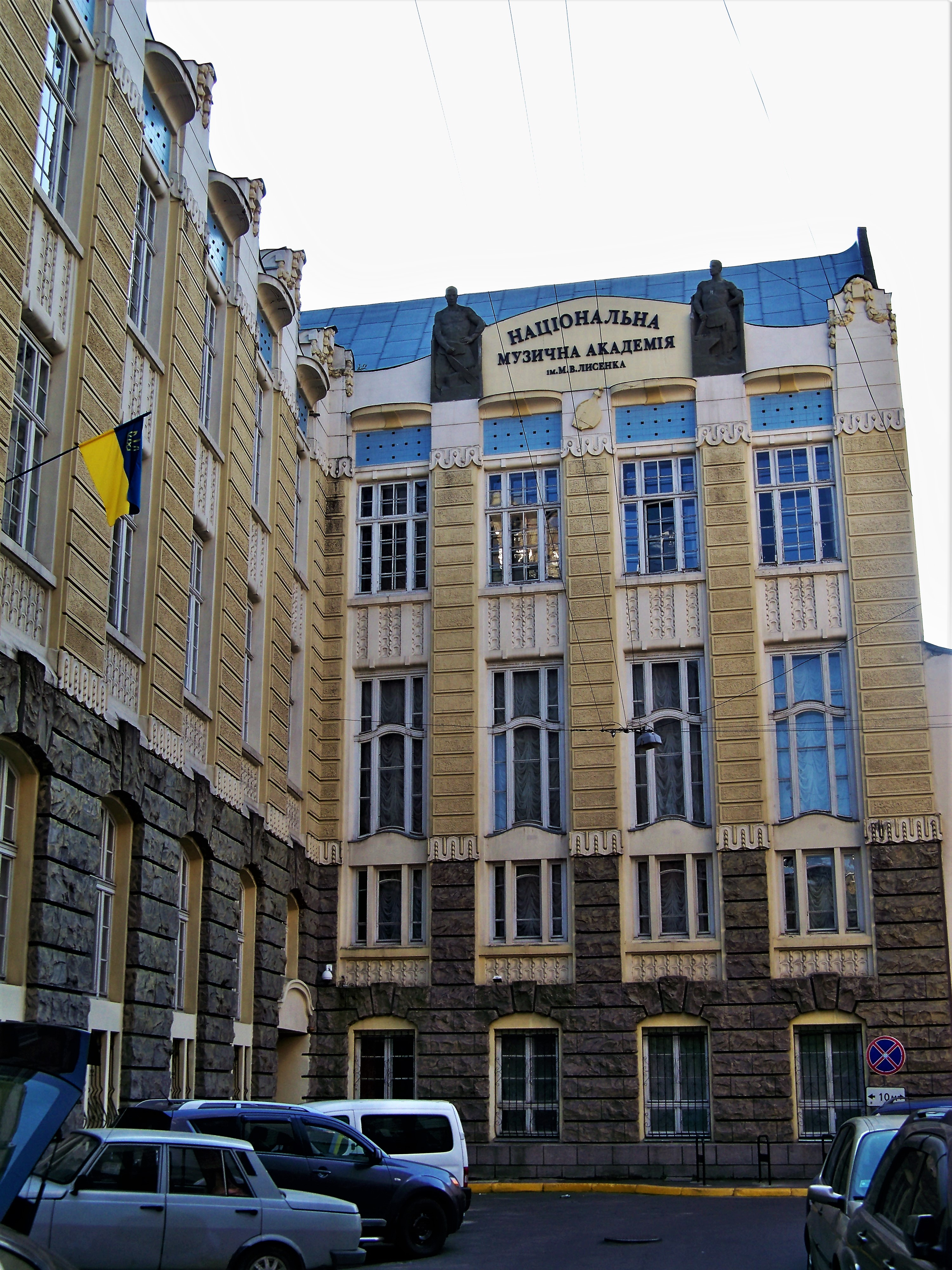
The Lviv Conservatory, where Skoryk was a student from 1955 to 1960

Between 1955 and 1960 Skoryk studied at the Lviv Conservatory, There he received training in musical composition and music theory; his teachers included Stanyslav Lyudkevych and Roman Simovych. Skoryk's final exam piece was Vesna ('Spring'), a cantata for soloists, mixed choir and orchestra that was based on verses by the Ukrainian writer Ivan Franko. Other piano pieces written during Skoryk's student years include a piano sonata, and V Karpatakh ('In the Carpathian Mountains'), also for solo piano. Skoryk was also a student of Mykola Kolessa.

In 1960, Skoryk enrolled in the postgraduate research program at the Moscow Conservatory, where he studied with the composer Dmitry Kabalevsky. He remained there for four years. During this time, Skoryk composed symphonic, chamber, and vocal music. Some works from this period include the Suite in D major for Strings, the Violin Sonata No. 1, and the Partita No. 1 for strings, and the Variations, Blues, and Burlesque.

== Teaching career ==
After graduating from the Moscow Conservatory in 1964, Skoryk, then 25, began his first teaching position, becoming Ukraine's youngest composition lecturer at the Lviv Conservatory, where he remained until 1966. He then accepted a position at the Kyiv Conservatory where he focused on teaching contemporary harmony techniques. His dissertation, completed in 1964, concentrated on the music of the Russian composer Sergei Prokofiev. Skoryk's book Struktura i vyrazhalna pryroda akordyky v muzitsi XX stolitti (The Structural Aspects of Chords in 20th Century Music) was published in 1983. His students included the composers Osvaldas Balakauskas, Ivan Karabyts and Yevhen Stankovych. Skoryk remained at the Kyiv Conservatory until 1988.

In 1963, Skoryk became the youngest member of the National Union of Composers of Ukraine. During his career, Skoryk was an active member of the union, and was co-chair with Stankovych from 2004 to 2010.

== Later years ==
In 1996, Skoryk moved with his family to Australia, and obtained Australian citizenship, but in 1999 returned to live in Ukraine. In April 2011, Skoryk was appointed as the artistic director of the Kyiv Opera, a position he held until 2016. He died on 1 June 2020 and was buried on Lviv's Lychakiv Cemetery.

== Music ==
Skoryk was a composer, pianist and conductor. His works have been performed by ensembles and soloists that include the Leontovych Quartet, Oleh Krysa, Volodymyr Vynnytsky, Oleg Chmyr, Mykola Suk, Victor Markiw, and Alexander Slobodyanik. He was one of the recipients of the Ukraine's Shevchenko National Prize in 1987 for his Cello Concerto. In addition to the works listed below, he also wrote a number of smaller ensemble works, songs, and the score for more than 40 films, including Tini zabutykh predkiv (Shadows of Forgotten Ancestors), and Vysokyy pereval (High Mountain Pass), which included his Melody in A minor.

Skoryk moved towards composing religious music at the end of the 20th century, these compositions include his spiritual concerto Requiem (1999); Psalms for various types of choirs (1999–2005); and the Liturgy of St. John Chrysostom (2005). According to the Ukrainian musicologist Liubov Kyianovska, who has written a biography of Skoryk, his spiritual compositions were "not a tribute to fashion", but "a quite natural consequence of long internal work" and the "resolution of the long process of the composer's creative evolution", and that the Liturgy is stylistically sensitive to the traditions of Ukrainian religious music.

Skoryk's religious opera Moses (2001) was the first Ukrainian opera on a biblical subject to be composed in nearly a century. The opera, which was premiered during the visit by Pope John Paul II to Ukraine in 2001, is based on a 1905 poem by Ivan Franko, which focuses upon Moses's struggles to lead his people into the Promised Land at the very end of his life; the text draws parallels between the sufferings of the Israelites and those of the people of Ukraine under the Soviets.

== Works ==
Data from Ukrainian Musicians, Internet Encyclopedia of Ukraine, and the Ukrainian Musical Encyclopedia.

The following is a list of works by Skoryk:

=== Vocal ===
- 1959 – Requiem
- 1962 – Four Romances on verses by Taras Shevchenko for voice and piano
- 1964 – Chelovek (The Person), cantata for soloists, chorus and symphony orchestra (in Russian)
- 1969 – 0:0 v nashu polzu (0:0 to Our Win), musical comedy
- 1974 – Try ukrajinski vesilni pisni (Three Ukrainian Wedding Songs) for voice and symphony orchestra
- 1977 – Na Rusalchyn Velykden (At the Rusalkas Easter), one-act opera
- 1978 – Pisni Arlekina (Harlequin's Songs), children's musical
- 1994 – Miniatures Times of the Year for mixed choir
- 1998 – Requiem, a spiritual work for unaccompanied choir
- 1999 – Mass for chamber choir
- 2001 – Moses, opera after Ivan Franko (in Ukrainian)
- 2003 – Hamaliia, a setting of a text by Taras Shevchenko
- 2015 – Penitential Psalm, commemorating the "Heavenly Hundred" protesters who were shot dead by snipers during the Euromaidan in February 2014

=== Instrumental ===
- 1959 – U Karpatakh (In the Carpathian Mountains) for piano
- 1959 – Album Leaf for solo piano; Carpathian Rhapsody for clarinet and piano
- 1959 – Melody for solo piano.
- 1959 – Three Jazz Pieces for 4-hands piano
- 1960 – Vesna' (Spring), cantata on verses by Ivan Franko for soloists, chorus and symphony orchestra
- 1960 – Waltz for symphony orchestra
- 1960 – Kolomyika for piano
- 1961 – Suite for string orchestra
- 1962 – Rondeau for piano
- 1962 – Variations for piano
- 1963 – Violin Sonata No. 1
- 1963 – Silnee smerti (Stronger than Death), symphonic poem
- 1964 – Burlesque for piano
- 1964 – Blues for piano
- 1965 – Hutsul Triptych (from the film score to Tini zabutykh predkiv (Shadows of Forgotten Ancestors))
- 1965 – Iz Dytjachoho albomu (From the Children's Album) for piano
- 1965 – Four children's plays for piano
- 1966 – Partita No. 1 for string orchestra
- 1967 – Kamenjari (Stonecutters), ballet after a poem by Ivan Franko
- 1969 – Violin Concerto; Skoryk has composed 9 violin concertos in total.
- 1969 – Recitatives and Rondeau, piano trio
- 1970 – Partita No. 2 for chamber orchestra
- 1972 – Carpathian Concerto for symphony orchestra
- 1973 – Orchestral suite from Kaminnyj hospodar (Stone Host) by Lesya Ukrainka
- 1973 – Three Fantasies from the Lviv Lute 16th-Century Tablature – arrangement for chamber orchestra
- 1974 – Partita No. 3 for string orchestra
- 1974 – Partita No. 4 for symphony orchestra
- 1975 – Partita No. 5, for piano
- 1977 – Piano Concerto No. 1 ("Youth")
- 1978 – Toccata for piano
- 1982 – Piano Concerto No. 2
- 1983 – Cello Concerto
- 1986-1989 – Six Preludes and Fugues for piano
- 1989-1998 – transcription of 24 Caprices for Solo Violin (Paganini) for symphonic orchestra
- 1990 – Violin Concerto No. 2
- 1990 – Melody for string orchestra (from music to the movie High Pass)
- 1990 – Violin Sonata No. 2
- 1992 – Solomia Krushelnytska - ballet
- 1993 – Symphonic poem 1933, commemorating the Holodomor of 1932 – 1933
- 1993 – fantasy on the theme of The Beatles songs for string orchestra
- 1993 – Diptych for chamber orchestra
- 1994 – Reminiscence of the Motherland - symphonic poem dedicated to the centenary of Ukrainian emigration to the United States
- 1994 – "ARIA" for cello (or violin) and piano
- 1995 – Three dances for two pianos
- 1996 – Partita No. 6 for string quartet
- 1996 – Carpathian Rhapsody for clarinet and piano (reworked in 2004 for violin)
- 1996-1997 – Piano Concerto No. 3
- 1997 – Album Sheet for string orchestra
- 1998 – Partita no. 7 for wind quintet
- 2001 – Violin Concerto No. 3
- 2002 – Violin Concerto No. 4
- 2004 – Violin Concerto No. 5
- 2006 – The Return of the Butterfly, ballet
- 2009 – Violin Concerto No. 6
- 2011 – Violin Concerto No. 7
- 2011 – Violin Concerto No. 8 ("Allusion to Chopin")
- 2014 – Violin Concerto No. 9

=== Popular music ===
LP records (issued by Melodiya):

- 1966 – Namalyui meni nich ("Draw Me the Night") - lyrics by Mykola Petrenko, vocals by Lyubov Chaikovska
- 1967 – Ne topchit' konvalii ("Don't tread the May bells") - lyrics by Rostyslav Bratun
- 1976 – Try trembity ("Three trembitas") - words by O. Vratariov, performed by VIA Kalyna

=== Film scores ===
- 1965 – Shadows of Forgotten Ancestors
- 1967 – Cossacks (cartoon)
- 1967 – This Hard Earth
- 1971 – Living Water
- 1972 – For Your Fate
- 1974 – Swan Geese are Flying
- 1974 – Private Life
- 1979 – Hryshko's Books (cartoon)
- 1979 – Invisible Job
- 1981 – High Pass
- 1984 – Prelude to Fate
- 1991 – Bells didn't toll when we were dying
- 1994 – Princess (series)
- 2007 – Mykyta the Fox (cartoon)
- 2019 – Taras. Return

== Awards ==
- People's Artist of Ukraine
- Hero of Ukraine Order of the State (2008).

== Sources ==
- Baley, Virko (2001). "Skoryk [Skorik], Myroslav Mykhaylovych". Grove Music Online (8th ed.). Oxford University Press. ISBN 978-1-56159-263-0. (subscription, Wikilibrary access, or UK public library membership required)
- Borysenko, V. K (2010). A Candle in Remembrance: an Oral History of the Ukrainian Genocide of 1932–1933. New York: Ukrainian National Women's League of America. ISBN 978-06153-6-708-8.
- Helbig, Adriana (2009). Culture and Customs of Ukraine. Westport, Connecticut: Greenwood Press. ISBN 978-03133-4-363-6.
- Markiw, Victor Radoslav (2010). The Life and Solo Piano Works of the Ukrainian Composer Myroslav Skoryk. Lewiston, New York: E. Mellen Press. ISBN 978-07734-3-002-0.
- Oleksiuk, Olga, ed. (2019). Individual Spirituality in Post-nonclassical Arts Education. Newcastle, UK: Cambridge Scholars Publishing. ISBN 978-15275-4-381-2.
