= Marc Regnier =

American classical guitarist

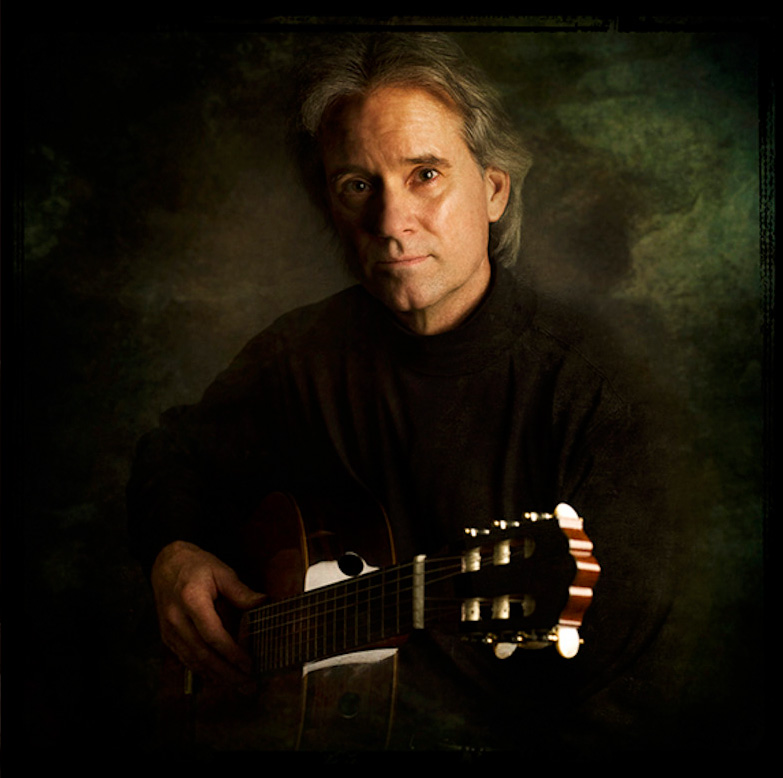

Background information
- Born: Florida, U.S.
- Genres: Classical
- Occupation: Musician
- Instrument: Classical guitar
- Labels: Musical Heritage Society, Sono Luminus, Naxos
- Website: www.marcregnier.com

Marc Regnier is an American classical guitarist.

== Biography ==
Marc Regnier is a Grammy-nominated classical guitarist. He has been described by critics as "a master of his instrument" and "a musician of intelligence, lyricism and subtlety." Since his concert debut at the age of fifteen, Regnier has performed in major cities throughout America from San Francisco to New York's Carnegie Recital Hall. He also has appeared in concert and given master classes in Canada and South America. He is a voting member of the National Academy of Recording Arts & Sciences.

His Grammy-nominated 2010 recording Gnattali: Solo & Chamber Works for Guitar was recorded at Skywalker Sound, produced by four-time Grammy winners Marina and Victor Ledin, and recorded by Grammy winning engineer Leslie Ann Jones. His music has been released on Naxos, Musical Heritage Society, and Dorian Sono Luminus labels.

Regnier's recordings have drawn such critical acclamation as "Rarely have the repertoire and the skills of a particular artist been combined as effectively...a significant recording on all accounts." (Fanfare). After his debut release Soundboard magazine proclaimed "...as pleasurable affair as any first recording since the advent of Manuel Barrueco."

Regnier currently chairs the guitar department at the College of Charleston in South Carolina.

== Discography ==
- Marc Regnier Plays Tres Canciones Populares Mexicanas (Musical Heritage Society), works by Manuel Ponce, Julián Orbón, Francisco Tárrega, Joaquin Nin-Culmell
- Canco Del Lladre (Musical Heritage Society) works by Isaac Albéniz, Agusti Grau, John W. Duarte, Miguel Llobet, Carlo Domeniconi, Celso Machado
- Alexandre Tansman: Guitar Music (Marco Polo/Naxos)
- The Polish Heart Naxos
- Radamés Gnattali: Solo & Chamber Works for Guitar (Sono Luminus, 2010)
- Zambra! (Sheva Collection, 2018)
